= Barandabhar Corridor Forest =

Forest in Nepal

The Barandabhar forest covers an area of 87.9 km^{2} and bisects the Chitwan District in east and west Chitwan. Barandabhar, a 29 km long forest patch, is bisected by the Mahendra Highway, resulting in a 56.9 km^{2} area in the buffer zone of RCNP and 31 km^{2} is under the district forest office.

The buffer zone area of BCF holds 48.016 km^{2} forest, 5.018 km^{2} grassland, 3.276 km^{2} shrub lands and 0.5 km^{2} of water bodies collectively called Bishazari lake. The surrounding six village development committees are Bachhauli, Gitanagar, Patihani, Jutpani, Pithuwa, Padampur (New) and two municipalities, Ratnanagar (Ward Number 5, 6, 7, 8 and 10), Bharatpur (Ward Number 8, 9, 11 and 12). The major rivers around the forest are Rapti, Budhi Rapti, and Khageri. The Beeshazari lake, which is located in the middle of jungle having altitude 256 m from sea level, is considered as the second largest natural wetland of Nepal and recently included in Ramsar site by NG.

== Inhabitants ==
The surrounding village development committees and municipalities consist a total of 1,25,652 person and the family size 5.95 including Tharus and other ethnic groups (KMTNC 2002 and Resource Himalaya 2000)

== Climate ==
The forest has range of climate seasons winter, spring and monsoon with subtropical climate. Mean annual minimum and maximum temperature, mean annual precipitation and mean annual relative humidity recorded during the year 1999–2001 at Rampur, approximately 11 km from study area has shown in figure 1. a, b and c respectively. The monsoon begins at the end of May and continues until September and the mean annual rainfall was 192 mm and highest in July (604.8 mm), lowest in January (0.9 mm) and no rainfall in December.

== Flora ==
The flora of Barandabhar forest is dominated mainly by sal forest and partly by riverine, tall grassland and short grassland. The percentage of vegetation of Chitwan Valley consists of (70%) sal forest (a moist deciduous type), grassland (20%), Riverine forest (7%) and sal with chir pine (3%). (Majupuria 1998). The latter type of vegetation is not present in Barandabhar forest.

=== Sal forest ===
Sal forest is dominated by sal (Shorea robusta) and the associated species with sal are Semecarpus anacardium, Terminalia bellirica, Terminalia tomentosa. A large number of other trees, shrubs, creepers, ferns, flowers and grasses grow among or under the sal.

=== Riverine forest ===
Riverine forests grow along watercourses and their composition varies greatly from place to place. Common species of riverine forest are simal (Bombax ceiba), sissoo (Dalbergia sissoo), and Bhellar (Trewia nudiflora) and in the lower canopy Clerodendrum viscosum, Zizyphus mauritiana are present.

=== Tall grassland ===
The alluvial flood plains support a luxuriant growth of grasses interspersed with patches of riverine forest. These tall and dense stands of grasses are popularly called 'elephant grass'. Tall grassland is dominated by kans (Saccharum spontaneum), and distributed along the Rapti and Budhi Rapti riverside.

=== Short grassland ===
Barandabhar forest is very important for short grassland, which is mainly dominated by Siru (Imperata sps.). It is the most important grass for human beings called as Siru Khar in Nepali, which is used by local people for thatching.

== Fauna ==
Sal forest dominated Barandabhar forest contains 22 species of mammals including tiger, rhinoceros, Asian elephant, sloth bear, wild boar, sambar deer, spotted deer, hog deer, barking deer and 280 species of birds including giant hornbill, hill myna, and storks. It is a critical habitat for many species of migratory birds (e.g., Siberian crane), aquatic birds, and mugger crocodile. More than 45 species of herpeto fauna represented by frog, toad, lizards, python and crocodile are found in Barandabhar Corridor Forest (Resource Himalaya 2000 and KMTNC 2002).

=== Ungulates ===
Among the six orders of ungulates, 3 orders are distributed in Nepal, which include Artiodactyla (deers and bovines), perissodactyla (horses and rhinoceros) and proboscidea (elephant) (Majupuria, 1998). Among the ungulate species found in Barandabhar Corridor Forest, rhinoceros and wild elephant are listed on APPENDIX I (threatened with extinction) of CITES, Endangered on the IUCN Red List of 1996 and protected by HMG/Nepal under schedule 1 (section 10) of the National Parks and Wildlife Conservation Act 2029 (HMGN 1973), but other 5 species are in common category.

- Spotted deer (Axis axis): Chital is indigenous to Sri Lanka, India, Bangladesh and Nepal (Prater 1998). The main distribution area in Nepal is throughout Tarai, with major concentrations in parks and reserves (Mishra 1982). In Chitwan, males averaged 71 kg and female averaged 75 cm at shoulder height and weighed 50 kg (Mishra 1982) and the rutting period reaches a peak in May when most of the stags have hard antlers (Mishra and Wemmer 1987). Chital prefer newly burned phatas as feeding habitats (Moe 1993) and rest in forest habitats during the middle of the day (Naess and Anderson 1993). Chital are nocturnal, but might feed until late in the morning (Prater 1998). Their social organization is variable with small groups of 2 - 20 individuals common, but herds of more than fifty animals can be found (Bhattarai 2003). The herd size varies seasonally, increasing during the monsoon season (75 - 81 individuals) (Schaller 1967 and Bhattarai 2003).
- Sambar deer (Cervus unicolor): The main distribution of sambar deer in Nepal is throughout reserves and parks of Tarai (Mishra 1982). The wooded districts of India, Burma, and Ceylon extending through the Malay countries and eastwards to the Philippines (Prater 1998). Hence sambar deer is widely distributed in the forests of southern Asia, but little studies have been done on its biology. Several short accounts are available on the biology of the species (Schaller 1967, Johnsingh, 1983 and Krishan, 1972). These short accounts together give a good background of the species. The coat is coarse and shaggy. The general colour is brown with a yellowish or grayish tinge. Females are lighter in tone; old stags tend to become very dark, almost black. Sambar is found in a wide variety of habitats and is an animal of high adaptability. Their food consists of grass, leaves, and various kinds of wild fruit. They feed mainly at night and retire into heavy cover at daybreak and do not usually come out till dusk (Prater 1998). The group size ranges from 2 to 4 (Bhattarai 2003) and rarely found associating in large numbers (Prater 1998). In disturbed forest, they are found mostly solitary and graze at early morning and late evening (Bhattarai 2003).
- Hog deer (Axis porcinus): Hog deer has a much wider distribution than chital and covers the area throughout the alluvial grassland of northern India, extending eastward to southern Nepal, Burma, Thailand, Indo-China, and Sri Lanka (Prater 1998). In Nepal, hog deer are mainly concentrated in Chitwan, Karnali-Bardia and Sukla Phantas (Mishra 1982). Antlers consist of long bony pedicels with a short brow tine and a straight beam with a fork at the top (Prater 1998 and Mishra 1982). Fawning occurred from January to April in Chitwan (Dhungel and O'Gara 1991). Mishra and Wemmer (1987) found that the fawning season starts in February and increases until May. Tall grasses along the riverbanks, open phantas are favoured habitats. They are generally solitary but sometimes-small groups may graze together. During the hot hours of the day hog deer shelter in tall grass and they feed early in the morning and in the evening (Dhungel and O'Gara 1991).
- Barking deer (Muntiacus muntjak): Muntjak is found in Nepal, northern India and Bhutan, from sea level to 3000 meters in the Himalayas (Mishra 1982). This is the smallest deer of Barandabhar Corridor Forest. The antlers are small, consisting of a short brow-tine and an unbranched beam set on bony hair covered pedicels (Prater 1998). Fawning season has a main peak in November and two smaller in May and August — September (Mishra and Wemmer 1987). Barking deer are solitary or exist in small family groups and are most common in dense forest habitats and graze in open forest edges and is fairly diurnal (Prater 1998).
- Wild boar (Sus scrofa): Wild boar is distributed throughout India, the southern part of Nepal, Burma and Sri Lanka (Prater 1998). Older boars are grayer than the more brownish young ones. Adults have a more of black bristles from the nape and down the back. Wild boar breed in all seasons, and after breeding they live together with other individuals at the same size or alone (Prater 1998). Wooded grassland, swampy areas, forest and dense bush are preferred habitats, and they build shelters of grass, reeds or brush. The wild boars are omnivorous, eating crops, roots, tubers, insects, snakes etc. (Prater 1998).
- Rhinoceros (Rhinoceros unicornis): The Indian one-horned rhinoceros ranged throughout northern India, Myitkina (Burma), and Nepal (southern central Tarai to far western Tarai) (Prater 1998). The Indian rhinoceros has also been reported in Sylhet (Bangladesh) and Cacher (Rook Maaker 1980). It is one of the largest of all existing rhinoceros. The skin of this massive creature is divided into great shields by heavy folds before and behind the shoulders and in front of the thighs. Though it prefers swamp, grass as well as the rhinoceros is also found in wood jungle up ravines and low hills (Prater 1998). They are recorded in river and lakes as well as grassland and forested area (Bhattarai 2003). All rhinoceros defecate on old piles and fresh dung is a stimulus to defecate. Usually, calves defecate after their mothers (Laurie 1979). The population of rhinoceros in Chitwan is considered as the second largest population in the world. There are altogether 612 rhinoceros in Nepal, with less than 100 rhinoceros in Nepal in the 1960s, the figure has risen to 612 in 2000, with a growth rate of 3.88% per year (DNPWC 2000).
- Asian elephant (Elephas maximus): Elephants are the largest living mammals found on land. The Asiatic or Indian elephant is widely distributed in the Himalayan Tarai in northern India, Nepal, Bangladesh, Sri Lanka, Burma, South China, Malaya, and Sumatra (Prater 1998). Generally only the males have large tusks. Elephants have very poor sight; the senses of smell and hearing are highly developed. Elephants chiefly frequent areas covered with tall forests of Nepal and India. Elephant sleep during the hot hours of the day, feed early in the morning and evening, in open forest or raid crops, retire to sleep after midnight (Prater 1998). The exact number of elephants in Nepal is not correctly assessed so far. There are, however, reports of annual fluctuation in their numbers due to their preference of favorable area in Nepal as well as Haldwani forest of India (Singh 1966). Thagunna (1999) studied about trans-boundary elephant corridor with great emphasis on protecting the wild elephant dispersal patterns of the far western Tarai region through corridor linking. According to their current population trends, the elephants are suffering from the adverse effects of mismanaged forests and loss of habitat. They occur in four main populations that exist along the eastern, central, western and far-western Tarai Belt, which has put their population of around 100 animals in the country, in grave danger.
