= Ichchhakamana Rural Municipality =

Ichchhakamana इच्छाकामना गाउँपालिका
- Rural Municipality
- Location of rural council Ichchhakamana (Nepal)
- Coordinates: 27.82°N 84.57°E
- Country: Nepal
- Province: Bagmati Province
- District: Chitwan
- Wards: 7
- Established: 10 March 2017

Government
  - Type: Rural Council
  - Chairperson: Mr. Dan Bahadur Gurung (दानबहादुर गुरुङ)(CPN-UML)
  - Vice-chairperson: Mrs. Maya Silwal (माया सिलवाल)(CPN-UML)

Area
  - Total: 166.67 km^{2} (64.35 sq mi)

Population (2011)
  - Total: 25,012
  - Density: 150.07/km^{2} (388.68/sq mi)
- Time zone: UTC+5:45 (Nepal Standard Time)
- Headquarter: Kurintar
- Website: ichchhakamanamun.gov.np

Ichchhakamna (Nepali: इच्छाकामना) is an only rural council located in Chitwan District in Bagmati Province of Nepal.

Total area of the rural municipality is 166.67 square kilometres (64.35 sq mi) and total population is 25012 individuals.

The rural municipality was formed on 10 March 2017, when Government of Nepal announced 753 local level units as per the new constitution of Nepal 2015. thus the rural municipality came into existence. The rural council was formed merging following former VDCs: Darechok, Chandi Bhanjyang, Kaule and Dahakhani. The rural council is divided into 7 wards and the admin center of the rural council is located at Chandi Bhanjyang.

== Demographics ==
At the time of the 2011 Nepal census, Ichchhakamna Rural Municipality had a population of 25,067. Of these, 58.5% spoke Nepali, 21.8% Chepang, 7.4% Magar, 7.1% Gurung, 1.9% Tamang, 0.9% Bhojpuri, 0.8% Newar, 0.3% Hindi, 0.3% Maithili, 0.3% Thakali, 0.3% Urdu, 0.2% Bhujel, 0.1% Rai, 0.1% Tharu,

In terms of ethnicity/caste, 33.4% were Chepang/Praja, 26.8% Gurung, 12.0% Magar, 4.8% Hill Brahmnin, 4.5% Chhetri, 3.9% Tamang, 3.2% Kami, 3.1% Newar, 3.0% Gharti/Bhujel, 1.3% Damai/Dholi, 0.8% Sanyasi/Dasnami, 0.6% Musalman, 0.5% Teli, 0.4% Thakali, 0.3% Rai, 0.2% Kalwar, 0.2% Kathabaniyan, 0.2% Tharu, 0.1% Kumal, 0.1% Majhi, 0.1% other Terai, 0.1% Thakuri, 0.1% Yadav and 0.4% others.

In terms of religion, 61.3% were Hindu, 26.5% Buddhist, 7.9% Christian, 3.6% Prakriti, 0.6% Muslim and 0.1% others.

== Ward Profile ==
Presidents of Wards

- Ward-no-1:Santa Bahadur Magar(Maoist-Centre)
- Ward-no-2:Pancha Bahadur Praja(CPN-UML)
- Ward-no-3:Nar Bahadur Nepal(CPN-UML)
- Ward-no-4:Rudra Prasad Upreti(CPN-UML)
- Ward-no-5:Tej Bahadur Sherchan(CPN-UML)
- Ward-no-6:Laxman Praja(CPN-UML)
- Ward-no-7:Bam Bahadur ThapaMagar(NC)
