= Birendranagar, Chitwan =

Birendranagar बिरेन्द्रनगर
- Village development committee
- Interactive map of Birendranagar
- Country: Nepal
- Zone: Narayani Zone
- District: Chitwan District

Population (2011)
  - Total: 14,934
- Time zone: UTC+5:45 (Nepal Time)

Birendranagar is a village development committee (VDC) in Chitwan District in the Narayani Zone of southern Nepal. At the time of the 2011 Nepal census, it had a population of 14,934 people (6,909 male; 8,025 female) living in 3,374 individual households.

Birendrangar is located 150 kilometres (93 mi) southwest of Kathmandu. In the district of Chitwan, Birendranagar is surrounded by six other VDCs: Khairahani, Chainpur, Siddhi, Korak, Bhandara and Kathar. It is about two times bigger than Bhandara and Khairahani and similar in area as Chainpur. The village is divided into nine wards, which are further subdivided into one to seven groups.

Since 2015, Birendranagar has developed into a larger municipality called Rapti Municipality, the municipality currently includes Birendranagar itself, Bhandara, and Piple.

== Infrastructure ==
There are at least four secondary schools in the area: Jana Adarsha Secondary School, Vidya Memorial School, Bramha Nagar School and Shakura Private School

== Geography ==
Birendranagar is largely covered by forests and has one river (known as Pumpha Khola) however rest of the other plain area is used for cultivation. Birendranagar is developing and has provided most of its residents with access to the Internet, cable television, as well as a transportation service.
