= Birendra Nagar =

Birendra Nagar may refer to several places in Nepal:

- Birendranagar, a city in Bheri Zone
- Birendra Nagar, Narayani, a village in Chitwan District
