= Chepang =

Chepang may refer to:

- Chepang people, a group indigenous to the lands of Nepal
- Chepang language, the language of the Chepang people belonging to the Chepangic languages
