= Kalika, Chitwan =

Kalika municipality कालिका tempol [का.न.पा.]
- Municipality
- Location in Nepal Kalika municipality (Nepal)
- Coordinates: 27.693°N 84.572°E
- Country: Nepal
- Province: Bagmati Province
- District: Chitwan District

Government
  - Mayor: Mr.Binod Regmi (विनोद रेग्मी) (CPN-UML)
  - Deputy Mayor: Mrs.Bimala Tamang (विमला तामाङ) (CPN-UML)
  - Executive Officer: Mr. Chudamani Sharma Gautam

Population (1991)
  - Total: 28,611
- Time zone: UTC+5:45 (NST)
- Website: kalikamun.gov.np

Kalika is a municipality in Chitwan District in the Narayani Zone of southern Nepal. This municipality was established in 2015 AD by merging the existing Jutpani, Padampur, Shaktikhor and Siddhi VDCs.

== Demographics ==
According to the results of National Census 2078, the total population is 52,164 (females 26,656 and males 25,508) and the number of households is 12,258.

At the time of the 2011 Nepal census, Kalika Municipality had a population of 44,898. Of these, 60.1% spoke Nepali, 12.3% Chepang, 12.1% Tharu, 10.4% Tamang, 1.3% Magar, 0.8% Maithili, 0.7% Gurung, 0.7% Newar, 0.6% Bote, 0.3% Bhojpuri, 0.2% Darai, 0.1% Ghale and 0.1% other languages as their first language.

In terms of ethnicity/caste, 17.7% were Hill Brahmin, 17.5% Chepang/Praja, 16.1% Tamang, 12.5% Tharu, 9.0% Chhetri, 5.3% Newar, 4.4% Magar, 4.1% Gurung, 3.1% Kami, 2.9% Kumal, 1.8% Damai/Dholi, 0.9% Bote, 0.8% Koiri/Kushwaha, 0.8% Sanyasi/Dasnami, 0.4% Gharti/Bhujel, 0.3% Darai, 0.3% Sarki, 0.3% Sunuwar, 0.3% Thakuri, 0.2% Ghale, 0.2% Musalman, 0.2% Rai, 0.1% Kayastha, 0.1% Majhi, 0.1% Sherpa, 0.1% Sonar and 0.2% others.

In terms of religion, 70.1% were Hindu, 18.1% Buddhist, 9.2% Christian, 0.4% Prakriti, 0.2% Muslim, and 1.9% others.

== Ward Profile ==
Presidents of Wards

- Ward-no-1:Santavir Sangdan(NC)
- Ward-no-2:Laxman Paudel(CPN-UML)
- Ward-no-3:Birendra Tamang(Maoist-Centre)
- Ward-no-4:Makarman Shrestha(CPN-UML)
- Ward-no-5:Deepak Bahadur Bhattarai(NC)
- Ward-no-6:Tika Ram Regmi(NC)
- Ward-no-7:Kamal Raj Muktan(NC)
- Ward-no-8:Chitra Bahadur Magar(Maoist-Centre)
- Ward-no-9:Nilakantha magar(CPN-UML)
- Ward-no-10:Nar Jung Praja(NC)
- Ward-no-11:Krishna Bahadur Praja(CPN-UML)

== Education ==
Schools

- Shree Prithivi Higher Secondary School
- Shree Bhimodaya model Secondary School
- Shaktikhor Secondary School
- Jamunapur Secondary School
- Samipur secondary school

== Health care ==
Kalika Hospital, one and only hospital

== Tourism Area ==
- Upperdang Gadi
- Shaktikhor Jharna
- Gairibari Jharna
- Love Danda
- Bhimwali park
- Viral Ghar
- Siraichuli
- Sinti Jharna

== Religious Places ==
- Kalika Temple, Jutpani
- Buddhist Gumba, Kamalchowk
- ShivaMandir, Gurau Chaur
- Khageri River, Chhatpuja

== Major Places ==
- Kholesimal Bazzar
- Club chowk
- Lahure Chowk
- Jutpani Bazzar
- Padampur Highschool Chowk
- Shaktikhor Bazzar
