= Madi, Chitwan =

Madi माडी
- Municipality
- Location Madi (Nepal)
- Coordinates: 27.4552°N 84.3184°E
- Country: Nepal
- Province: Bagmati Province
- District: Chitwan District
- Established: 02 December 2014

Government
  - Type: Mayor-council
  - Mayor: Tara Kumari Kaji Mahato(CPN-UML)
  - Deputy Mayor: Khem Prasad Mahato(NC)

Area
  - Total: 218.24 km^{2} (84.26 sq mi)

Population (2011)
  - Total: 37,683
  - Density: 172.67/km^{2} (447.21/sq mi)
- Website: https://maddimun.gov.np/en

Madi (Nepali: माडी नगरपालिका) is a municipality in Chitwan District of Nepal. With the population about 50,000, it is the fifth municipality in the district. Former four village development committee serially from East to West Ayodhyapuri (अयोध्यापुरी), Kalyanpur (कल्याणपुर), Baghauda (बघौडा) and Gardi (गर्दी) are politically merged to form Madi municipality. Geologically, Madi is a valley with north facing Churevabar and remaining surrounded with Shomeshowar Mountain . It is known for several ancient religious sites. Pandavas were here in their 12 years exile. There is a village named after them, Pandava Nagar in western Madi. This is also the sacred place for Hindus as the Saga Valmiki lived here thousands years ago.

== Demographics ==
At the time of the 2011 Nepal census, Madi Municipality had a population of 37,764. Of these, 60.5% spoke Nepali, 24.5% Tharu, 3.0% Tamang, 2.6% Bhojpuri, 2.6% Chepang, 2.3% Bote, 1.9% Gurung, 1.0% Magar, 0.9% Darai, 0.3% Newar, 0.2% Maithili, 0.1% Hindi and 0.1% other languages as their first language.

In terms of ethnicity/caste, 25.2% were Hill Brahmin, 25.0% Tharu, 9.9% Kami, 7.3% Chhetri, 4.1% Tamang, 3.5% Gurung, 3.1% Bote, 3.1% Chepang/Praja, 3.1% Damai/Dholi, 3.0% Magar, 1.5% Sarki, 1.4% Gharti/Bhujel, 1.3% Darai, 1.2% Rai, 1.0% Newar 0.9% Musalman, 0.6% Dura, 0.6% Gaine, 0.6% Teli, 0.5% Mallaha, 0.4% Kumal, 0.4% Thakuri, 0.3% Sonar, 0.2% Badi, 0.2% Bhote, 0.2% Kalwar, 0.2% Kanu, 0.2% Kathabaniyan, 0.2% Majhi, 0.2% Sanyasi/Dasnami, 0.1% Chamar/Harijan/Ram, 0.1% Koiri/Kushwaha, 0.1% other Terai and 0.2% others.

In terms of religion, 88.9% were Hindu, 7.0% Buddhist, 2.8% Christian, 0.9% Muslim, 0.1% Prakriti and 0.3% others.

== Ward profile ==
Presidents of Wards

- Ward-no-1:Amit Kumar Lama(RPP)
- Ward-no-2:Dandapani Poudel(Maoist-Centre)
- Ward-no-3:Puran Mahato(Unified Socialist)
- Ward-no-4:Madhav Prasad Chapagai(Maoist-Centre)
- Ward-no-5:Ganesh Prasad Vishwakarma(Maoist-Centre)
- Ward-no-6:Dipendra Raj Paudel(CPN-UML)
- Ward-no-7:Chandra Kumari Bania(Unified Socialist)
- Ward-no-8:Virendra Bahadur Bhandari(RPP)
- Ward-no-9:Ghanshyam Dawadi(Maoist-Centre)
