= Pancha Kanya =

Pancha Kanya पञ्चकन्या
- Village development committee
- Country: Nepal
- Zone: Narayani Zone
- District: Chitwan District

Area
  - Total: 16.29 km^{2} (6.29 sq mi)

Population (2011)
  - Total: 20,476
  - Density: 1,257/km^{2} (3,256/sq mi)
- Time zone: UTC+5:45 (Nepal Time)

Pancha Kanya is a village development committee in Chitwan District in the Narayani Zone of southern Nepal. At the time of the 1991 Nepal census it had a population of 10,281 people living in 1,996 individual households.
