= Chandi Bhanjyang =

Chandi Bhanjyang may refer to:

- Chandi Bhanjyang, Gandaki, Nepal
- Chandi Bhanjyang, Narayani, Nepal
