= Phulbari, Chitwan =

Phulbari फुलबारी
- Location in Nepal
- Coordinates: 27.64°N 84.37°E
- Country: Nepal
- Province: Bagmati Province
- District: Chitwan District
- Municipality: Bharatpur Metropolitan City

Population (2011)
  - Total: 3,862
- Time zone: UTC+5:45 (Nepal Time)

Phulbari is a village situated in Chitwan district of Nepal. At the time of the 2011 Nepal census it had a population of 3,862 people (1,791 male; 2,071 female) living in 945 individual households.
