= Dibyanagar =

Dibyanagar दिव्यनगर
- Village development committee
- Location in Nepal
- Coordinates: 27.61°N 84.26°E
- Country: Nepal
- Province: Bagmati Province
- District: Chitwan District

Population (2011)
  - Total: 8,334
- Time zone: UTC+5:45 (Nepal Time)

Dibyanagar is a village development committee in Chitwan District in Bagmati Province of southern Nepal. At the time of the 2011 Nepal census it had a population of 8,334 people (3,787 male; 4,547 female) living in 1,936 individual households. Current President of ward, Prassidha Tiwari is the youngest head in history of this VDC.
