= Meghauli =

Meghauli मेघौली
- Village of Bharatpur Metropolitan City (Ward No. 27 & 28)
- Location in Nepal
- Coordinates: 27.58°N 84.21°E
- Country: Nepal
- Province: Bagmati Province
- District: Chitwan District

Population (1991)
  - Total: 12,281
  - Ethnicities: Brahmin Chhetri Tharu Newar Gurung Magars Tamang Kumal Darai Musahar etc.
  - Religions: Hindu Buddhist is main religions

Languages
  - Local: Nepali, Tharu, Nepal Bhasa, Tamang, Gurung, Magar etc.
- Time zone: UTC+5:45 (Nepal Time)

Meghauli (Nepali : मेघौली) is a small city and former Village Development Committee that is now part of Bharatpur Metropolitan City in Bagmati Province of central Nepal.

In December 2014, Meghauli among neighboring other Village Development Committees was merged to form Narayani Municipality. In 2016 Narayani Municipality was itself merged into Bharatpur creating the metropolitan city of Bharatpur. The former Meghauli V.D.C. looks after civic affairs in the town. The municipal area is divided into two wards of Bharatpur Metropolitan City, Ward No. 27 & 28.

At the time of the 1991 Nepal census it had a population of 12,281 people living in 2027 individual households.

Meghauli village touches over 25 km of the borders of the park and is situated on the banks of the Rapti and Narayani River. Situated at 172 km from Kathmandu, Meghauli is in the western part of Chitwan district. Meghauli is one of the richest villages in Chitwan in terms of wildlife, different cultures and sports is located in the adjacent of Chitwan National Park.

== Places of interest ==
Chitwan National Park
- IUCN category II (national park)
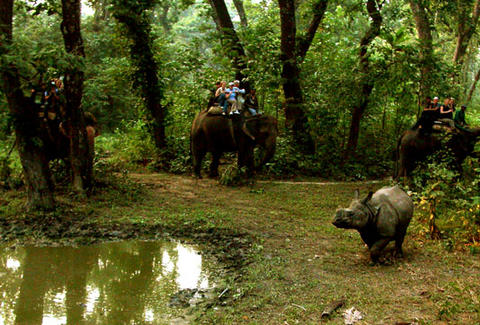
- Elephant safari after one horned rhinos
- Interactive map of Chitwan National Park

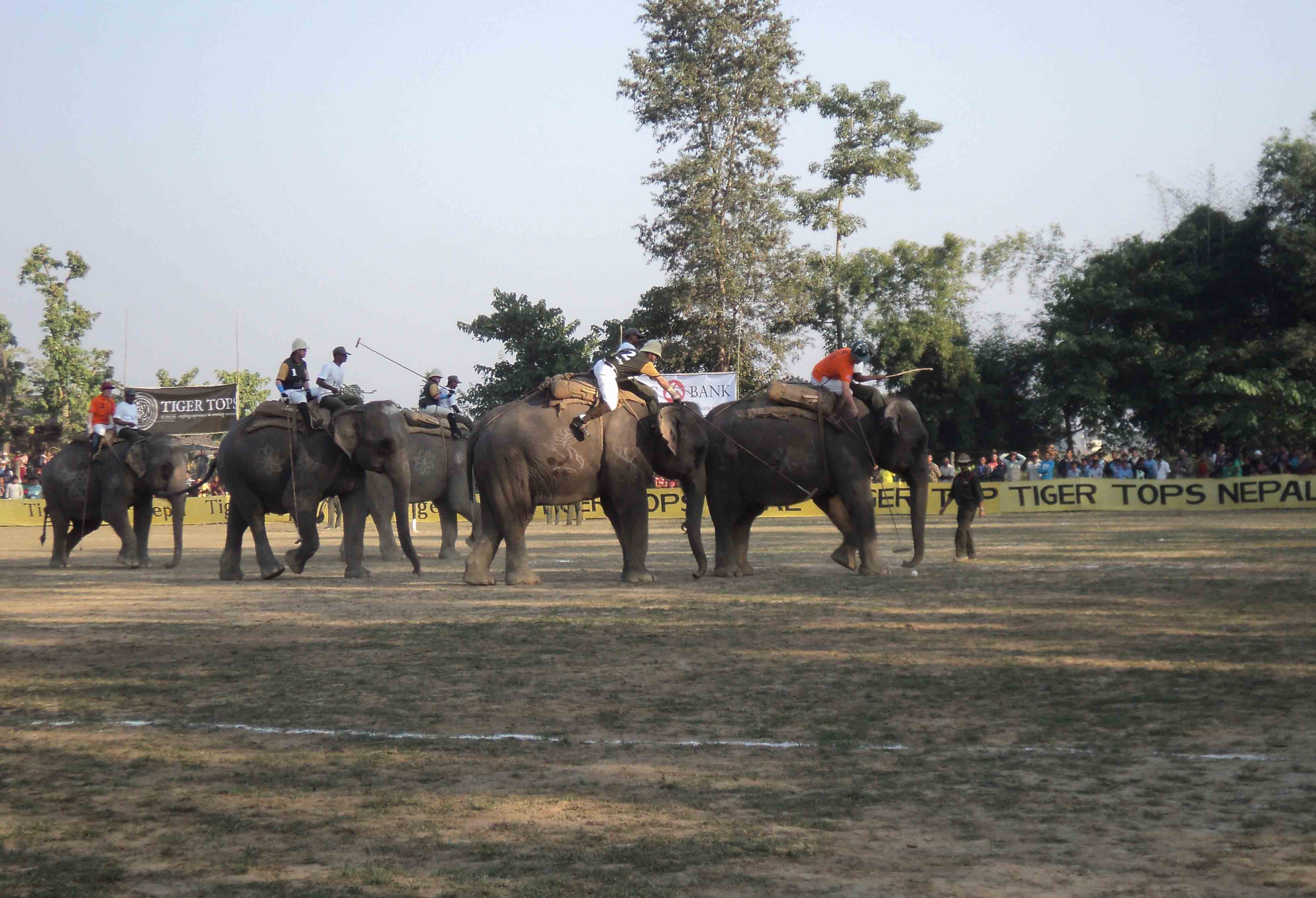
Elephant Polo World Cup 2012 in Meghauli, Nepal

Meghauli is the western entrance of the Chitwan National Park that attracts thousands of visitors every year to explore its rich flora and fauna. The huge 25 km long community forest is another eye catching object of Meghauli.

The new concept had been materialized for the tourism development in Meghauli. National park entrance gate, elephant stable, view tower, eco park. National crocodile dreediy pond and medicinal herbal farming in the buffer zone are the main attractions in the Meghauli.

The well-preserved village provides an example of a traditional settlement and offers an opportunity to learn about the Indigenous Tharu people.

Apart from these, Meghauli has excellent potential for the establishment of resorts and hotels. Rhino Resort, Golaghat Wildlife Resort, Barahi Resort, Chital lodge, Chautari lodge, Ecopark Volunteering and restaurant etc. are serving to some extent who come to visit Megauli.

Rafters, after a trip end at the Golaghat, the confluence of Narayani and Rapti River, can see the sunset and a view of the Himalayas. Meghauli has a good balance between human settlement and wildlife.

There is bird watching for Bengal florican, giant horn bill, lesser florican, black stork and white stork. One can also see one horned rhinos, royal Bengal tiger, chital, hog deer, barking deer, sloth bear, palm civet, langur monkey and the gharial crocodile along with many other common species such as gaur, elephant, hyena, pangolin, Gangetic dolphin, monitor lizard, and striped python. The village has a wide area for sporting activities. Every year sports like para jumping and elephant polo are held in Meghauli. One can also see the local Tharu stick dance, tiger dance and mask dance ghost dance which are popular in this village.

=== Narayani River ===
Narayani River flows north of Meghauli. Narayani river is the deepest and also one of the biggest rivers of Nepal. Eastern side of the Narayani river bank in Meghauli is regarded as the holy site for Hindu rituals.

=== Rapti River ===
Rapti River flows South of Meghauli and bank of the Chitwan National Park. confluence of Narayani and Rapti River at Golaghat

=== Narayangarh ===
Narayangarh in Bharatpur city, is the main shopping and commercial area for Meghauli residents. Is the main transit point for all the vehicles traveling via east-west Mahendra Highway and also for the people traveling from Kathmandu, Gorkha, and Pokhara through Mugling road.

Recently, Narayangarh has become a retail and commercial capital of whole Chitwan district and Bharatpur Metropolitan City. It is also the center for hospitality industry which includes Hotels, Lodges, Restaurants etc. and transportation hub for Chitwan district.

== Transportation ==

Meghauli Airport, (IATA: MEY, ICAO: VNMG) is located in about 26 km west of the city center of Bharatpur in the Chitwan District. The airport resides at an elevation of 600 feet (183 m) above mean sea level. It has one runway which is 1,085 metres (3,560 ft) in length. It is the gateway airport to Chitwan National Park, and sees thousands of tourists annually. Permits for Foreign tourists intending to journey to Chitwan are issued at this airport.

Mahendra East West Highway connects from the Chaubiskothi Bharatpur, Bus, micro bus and other land transportation are available to go out of the Meghauli,. Parsadhap Bazaar, EcoPark, Telauli Bazaar, Meghauli Bazaar, Sajhapur, Jitpur Bazaar, Bhagaha and Golaghat are major centres at intersections of major roads.

== Agriculture ==
The people inhabiting the Meghauli are predominantly peasant farmers cultivating mainly food and cash crops such as rice, maize, wheat, beans, lentils, mustard and vegetables. The poultry industry in the village constitutes a significant proportion of the district's poultry industry.

== Educational institutions ==
- Milly Jully Secondary English Boarding School, Parsadhap
- Pragya Academy, Parsadhap
- Shree Kajiman Basic School, Parsadhap
- Shree Janaki Secondary School, Meghauli
- Shree National Basic School, Dharampur
- Namuna English Boarding School, Gautamnagar
- Shree Sajhapur Secondary School, Sajhapur
- Shree Saraswati Secondary School, Jitpur
- Shree National Basic School, Andrauli
- Shree National Basic SChool, Sishabass

== Religion ==
Meghauli religiosity
religion	percent
Hinduism	70.1%
Buddhism	27.3%
Christianity	2.4%
Other	0.2%

The overwhelming majority of the Meghauli population follows Hinduism or Buddhism. There are also significant numbers of Christians, Muslims.
