= Sukranagar =

Sukranagar शुक्रनगर
- Village development committee
- Location in Nepal
- Coordinates: 27.59°N 84.28°E
- Country: Nepal
- Zone: Narayani Zone
- District: Chitwan District

Population (1991)
  - Total: 6,750
- Time zone: UTC+5:45 (Nepal Time)

Sukranagar is a village development committee in Chitwan District in the Narayani Zone of southern Nepal. At the time of the 1991 Nepal census it had a population of 6,750 people living in 1,128 individual households. By 2009, the population has exceeded 30,000.

Located just across Nepal's Chitwan National Park, Sukranagar is home to subsistence farmers who nominally live off the land using traditional farming practices. Being in the proximity of the national park, farmers here traditionally had a close relationship with the National Park. This relationship also invited some illegal transactions of forest products and livestock grazing in the park, and illegal hunting and fishing, all despised by the conservation authorities. Similarly crop damage by wild animals from the park have become a matter of concern for the local people. In various ways, there has been a reciprocal relationship between the park and local people. The people settled adjacent to the park are dependent on its resources primarily due to absence of convenient alternatives. This means that there is a tremendous opportunity for thoughtful and resourceful people to develop alternative economic and agricultural practices that can positively exploit the proximity of the park and the rich combination of plants and animals that exist in the park. There is an opportunity for conservation, environmental safeguarding, and economic activities.
