= Jagatpur, Chitwan =

Jagatpur जगतपुर
- Former Village development committee
- Location in Nepal
- Coordinates: 27.57°N 84.31°E
- Country: Nepal
- Province: Bagmati Province
- District: Chitwan District

Population (2011)
  - Total: 11,195
- Time zone: UTC+5:45 (Nepal Time)

Jagatpur is a small town of Bharatpur Metropolitan City and former village development committee in Chitwan District, Bagmati Province of Nepal. At the time of the 2011 Nepal census it had a population of 11,195 people (5,217 male; 5,978 female) living in 2,635 individual households.

Jagatpur is a developing tourism center located 20 kilometres northwest of the district headquarters, Bharatpur. It serves as an entry point to Kasara, the headquarters of Chitwan National Park. The area features various accommodations and is a destination for wildlife tourism, including elephant-guided safari tours to view local fauna such as the one-horned rhinoceros and wild felid species. Nearby attractions within the national park include a government-managed gharial breeding center and the historic Bikram Baba temple. Additionally, the park provides direct route access connecting Jagatpur to Sauraha.

== Geography and transportation ==
In addition to road access, Jagatpur has air connections through Bharatpur airport with regular daily air services from Pokhara and Kathmandu. The airport lies just 20 kilometer to the northeast of Jagatpur. Will need to change to bus or taxi for connection to Jagatpur. By bus Via Kathmandu: there are different types of buses available. You can find direct route bus in from kathmandu to Jagatpur as Local buses service from Narayani Transportation organization or you can take kathmandu-Bhartpur buses and change from Jagatpur Bus-park or Lions Chowk. And you will also find regular tourist buses as direct route to Jagatpur.

Via Pokhara: direct tourist buses are available via Mugling, Narayangarh / Bharatpur, Jagatpur; 3 – 4 hours.

Besides Kathmandu and Pokhara there is a direct route to Bharatpur/Narayangarh, for which you need to take another bus/taxi for Jagatpur either in Jagatpur(west chitwan bus park) bus park or in Lions Chowk.
