= Rapti Municipality =

Municipality in Bagmati Province, Nepal

Rapti Municipality राप्ति नगरपालिका
- Municipality
- Location in Nepal Rapti Municipality (Nepal)
- Coordinates: 27.603947°N 84.646058°E
- Country: Nepal
- Province: Bagmati
- District: Chitwan

Government
  - Mayor: Mr. Samsher Lama ( United Socialist)
  - Deputy Mayor: Mr.Devendra Lama (NC)

Population (2011)
  - Total: 46,510
- Time zone: UTC+5:45 (NST)
- Post code: 44202
- Area code: 056
- Website: https://raptimun.gov.np/en

Rapti Municipality (Nepali: राप्ति नगरपालिका) is a municipality which lies in Eastern part of Chitwan district in Bagmati Province of Nepal. It was formed as municipality in 2015 by merging five existing village development committees, Birendranagar VDC, Bhandara VDC, Piple VDC, Lothar VDC and Korak VDC. Total area of this municipality is 99.40 (Sq Km) and population of this municipality according to 2068 BS census is 46510.

Prabha Baral and Iman Singh Lama are the first Mayor and Deputy mayor respectively elected by the Local election held in 2017. There are a total of 13 ward in the municipality.

== Demographics ==
At the time of the 2011 Nepal census Rapti Municipality had a population of 59,937. Of these, 61.0% spoke Nepali, 15.4% Chepang, 12.8% Tamang, 6.1% Tharu, 0.9% Gurung, 0.9% Newar, 0.8% Darai, 0.7% Bhojpuri, 0.7% Magar, 0.2% Maithili, 0.1% Danuwar, 0.1% Kham, 0.1% Hindi, 0.1% Rai, and 0.1% other languages as their first language.

In terms of ethnicity/caste, were 22.0% Hill Brahmin, 18.8% Tamang, 17.1% Chepang/Praja, 8.9% Chhetri, 6.1% Tharu, 4.6% Magar, 4.4% Newar, 3.9% Kami, 2.8% Rai, 2.2% Damai/Dholi, 2.1% Gurung, 1.8% Danuwar, 1.1% Sarki, 0.8% Darai, 0.5% Sanyasi/Dasnami, 0.5% Thakuri, 0.3% other Dalit, 0.3% Gharti/Bhujel, 0.3% Musalman, 0.2% Ghale, 0.2% Sunuwar, 0.1% Hajam/Thakur, 0.1% Kalwar, 0.1% Kanu, 0.1% Kathabaniyan, 0.1% Mallaha, 0.1% Teli, 0.1% other Terai and 0.2% others.

In terms of religion, 71.0% were Hindu, 18.0% Buddhist, 7.4% Christian, 3.1% Prakriti, 0.3% Muslim and 0.2% others.

== Ward Profile ==
Presidents of Wards:

- Ward-no-1:Sidbilal Syangtan(CPN-UML)
- Ward-no-2:Shyam Sundar Upreti(CPN-UML)
- Ward-no-3:Shiv Kant Oli(CPN-UML)
- Ward-no-4:Kedar Prasad Acharya(CPN-UML)
- Ward-no-5:Sitaram Tamang(CPN-UML)
- Ward-no-6:Jallu Mahato Tharu(CPN-UML)
- Ward-no-7:Sumita Dallakoti(Independent)
- Ward-no-8:Purna Prasad Acharya(CPN-UML)
- Ward-no-9:Khank Bahadur Tamang(CPN-UML)
- Ward-no-10:Tej Bahadur Tamang(NC)
- Ward-no-11:Buddhi Bahadur Tamang(Unified Socialist)
- Ward-no-12:Arjuna Praja(NC)
- Ward-no-13:Ashok Kumar Praja(NC)
