= Chitwan Higher Secondary School =

School in Bagmatti Pradesh, Nepal

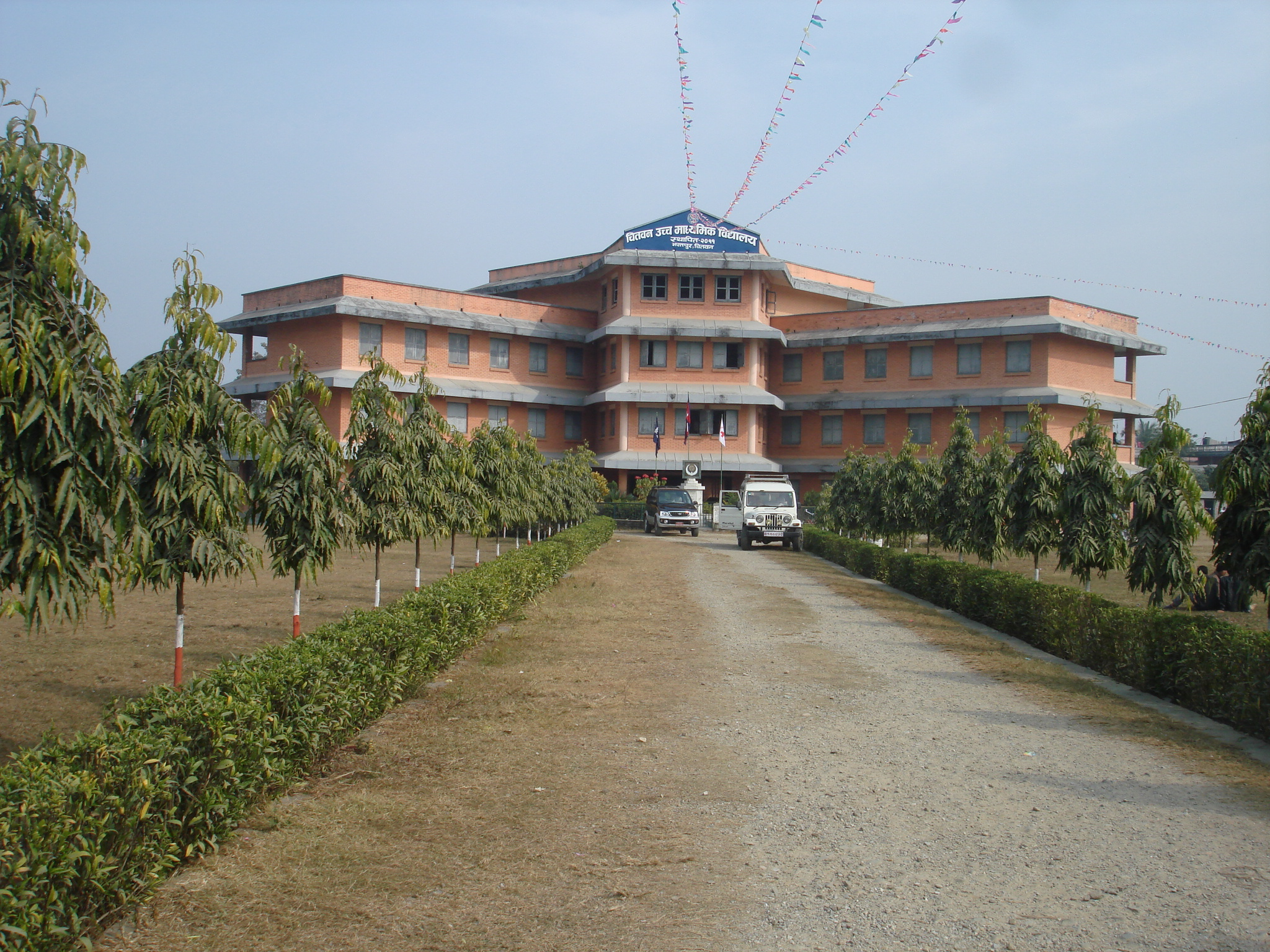

Information
- Established: 1954; 71 years ago

Chitwan Higher Secondary School is the oldest government school in Chitwan District. It was established in 2011 BS (1954 AD). This school have 10+2 and offer bachelors level programs.
