= Parsa Bazar =

Town in Nepal

Parsa Bazar (पर्साबजार) is a town situated in 18 km east of Bharatpur, in Chitwan District, Nepal. It is central part of the country and directly connected with Mahendra Highway in Khairahani Municipality. It has population of about 65,000, and is one of the major marketing centre for the people residing in eastern part of the district Chitwan.
