= Buddha Shanti Higher Secondary School =

Higher secondary school in India

Coordinates: 27.59182°N 84.67988°E

Buddha Shanti Higher Secondary School Nepali: ne:बुद्ध शान्ति उच्च माध्यामिक बिद्यालय
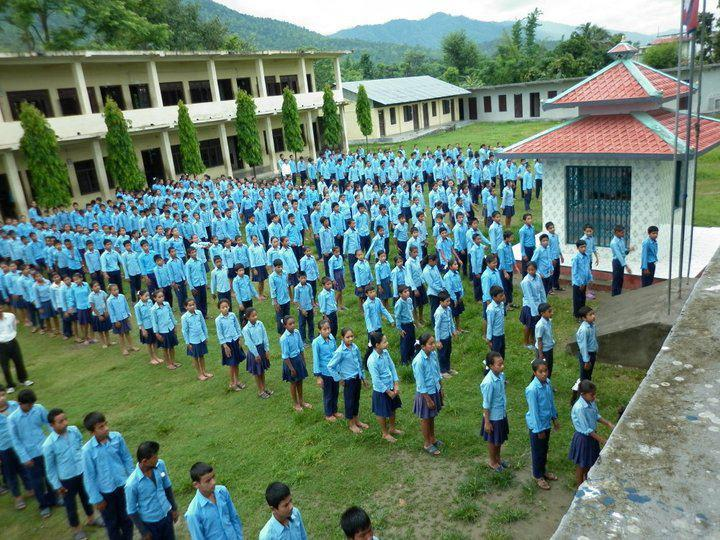
- Gadyauli, Rapti Municipality, Chitwan; Nepal

Information
- Type: Public Campus
- Established: 2030 B. S.
- Principal: Nawaraj Adhikari
- Enrollment: 1500
- Language: English Nepali
- Affiliation: HSEB, TU

Buddha Shanti Higher Secondary School (Nepali: ne:बुद्ध शान्ति उच्च माध्यामिक बिद्यालय) is a higher secondary school located in Rapti Municipality, Chitwan. It was established in 2030 BS (1973) with the name Gadyauli Ma. Vi. and changed later to Buddha Shanti Higher Secondary School. Formerly it was named from the location of the school, Gadyauli, and later it was named for Buddha and Shanti (peace). In that way Buddha Shanti Secondary School is helping the nation to get into peace from providing education for the people of the nation.

With more than 2,000 students, Buddha Shanti HSS is one of the leading educators in Chitwan district. 1-10 grade by the SLC board of Nepal, 11 and 12 grade by HSEB and bachelor's degree is affiliated by Tribhuvan University.
