= Lothar, Nepal =

Lothar लोथर
- Village development committee
- Location in Nepal
- Coordinates: 27.70°N 84.75°E
- Country: Nepal
- Zone: Narayani Zone
- District: Chitwan District

Population (1991)
  - Total: 3,425
- Time zone: UTC+5:45 (Nepal Time)

Lothar is a village development committee in Chitwan District in the Narayani Zone of southern Nepal. At the time of the 1991 Nepal census it had a population of 3,425 people living in 364 individual households.
