= Ayodhyapuri =

Place in Bagmati Province, Nepal

Ayodhyapuri अयोध्यापुरी
- Former Village development committee Now a part of Madi Municipality
- Location in Nepal
- Coordinates: 27.40°N 84.43°E
- Country: Nepal
- Province: Bagmati Province
- District: Chitwan District

Population (2011)
  - Total: 10,693
- Time zone: UTC+5:45 (Nepal Time)

Ayodhyapuri (Nepali: अयोध्यापुरी) is a former village development committee and now a part of Madi Municipality in Chitwan District, Bagmati Province of southern Nepal. At the time of the 2011 Nepal census it had a population of 10,693 people (4,914 male; 5,779 female) living in 2,555 individual households. The main economic activity among villagers is subsistence agriculture.

Ayodhyapuri is one of the places thought and claimed by Nepal PM as the birthplace of the Hindu deity Rama, based on the research of researcher Lok Mani Paudel, and the place where ancient Ayodhyapuri city lied.

The Department of Archeology of Nepal has started an archeological excavation to look for evidence in support of Ayodhyapuri's claim.

== See also ==
- Ram Janmabhoomi
