= Narayanpur, Chitwan =

Narayanpur नारायणपुर
- Village development committee
- Country: Nepal
- Zone: Narayani Zone
- District: Chitwan District

Area
  - Total: 9.91 km^{2} (3.83 sq mi)

Population (2021)
  - Total: 13,710
  - Density: 1,380/km^{2} (3,580/sq mi)
- Time zone: UTC+5:45 (Nepal Time)

Narayanpur is a village development committee in Chitwan District in the Narayani Zone of southern Nepal. At the time of the 2021 Nepal census it had a population of 13,710 people living in 3,435 individual households.
