= Siddi, Nepal =

Siddi सिद्धि
- Village development committee
- Location in Nepal
- Coordinates: 27.71°N 84.65°E
- Country: Nepal
- Zone: Narayani Zone
- District: Chitwan District

Population (1991)
  - Total: 2,577
- Time zone: UTC+5:45 (Nepal Time)

Siddi is a village development committee in Chitwan District in the Narayani Zone of southern Nepal. At the time of the 1991 Nepal census it had a population of 2,577 people living in 404 individual households.
