= Darechok =

Village development committee in Bagmati Province, Nepal

Darechok दारेचोक
- Village development committee
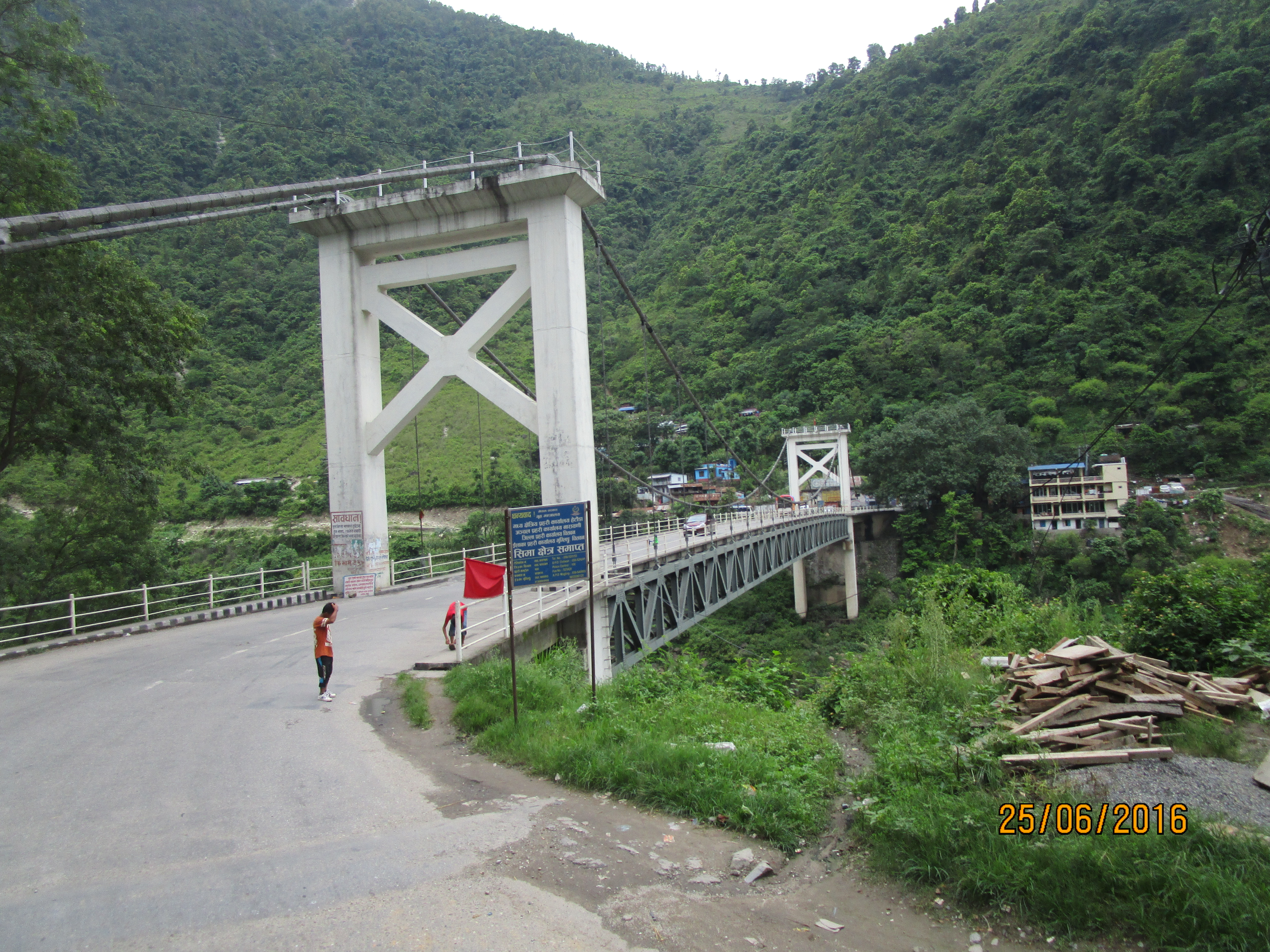
- Trishuli Bridge at Mugling, Darechok

- Location in Nepal
- Coordinates: 27.85°N 84.61°E
- Country: Nepal
- Province: Bagmati Province
- District: Chitwan District

Population (2011)
  - Total: 9,607
- Time zone: UTC+5:45 (Nepal Time)

Darechok is a village development committee in Chitwan District in Bagmati Province of southern Nepal. At the time of the 2011 Nepal census it had a population of 9,607 people (4,836 male; 4,771 female) living in 2,029 individual households.
