= Daisy School =

- khairahani-8,parsa,chitwan

Information
- School type: Boarding school
- Established: c. 1984
- Principal: Prem Raj Rimal
- Teaching staff: c. 100
- Enrollment: c. 2,100
- Language: English
- Website: mydaisyschool.com

Daisy School is an English school in the eastern part of the Chitwan District, Nepal. The principal of this school is Prem Raj Rimal.

The school has +2 level for higher study.

Introduction of science program in 10+2 Level

== History ==
The school was established in 2040 BS (c. 1984).

It has introduced to teach science in +2 level since 2014 (2071 BS) with experienced faculties. It is one of highest-ranked school in Chitwan as well as in Nepal.
