= Pithuwa =

Pithuwa पिठुवा
- Suburbs
- Location in Nepal
- Coordinates: 27.65°N 84.56°E
- Country: Nepal
- Zone: Narayani Zone
- District: Chitwan District

Area
  - Total: 13.8 km^{2} (5.3 sq mi)

Population (2011)
  - Total: 12,579
  - Density: 912/km^{2} (2,360/sq mi)
- Time zone: UTC+5:45 (Nepal Time)
- Area code: 056

Pithuwa is one of the developed suburb area of Ratnanagar Municipality in Chitwan District in the Narayani Zone of southern Nepal. The area consists of Ward No. 13, 14 & 15. According to 2011 Nepal census survey it had a population of 12,579 (5696 male & 6883 female ) people living in 2,898 individual households . Pithuwa is located West to the Kayer river [कयर खोला], East and North to Tandi and South to Khairhani Municipality. Most people of this suburbs are immigrants of Gorkha and Dhading districts. It lies in constituency region no. 2 out of five constituencies of Chitwan. The total population living here are the more immigrated from the hills, especially from Gorkha and Dhading districts. Here are also some indigenous communities, various ethnic group which co-relate their individual values and cultures like Tharus and Darais. Jana Jagriti Higher Secondary School [जन जागृती उच्च. मा. बि.], only higher secondary school of the suburbs which is the sole provider of higher education and periphery since about 5 decades. It is one of the most beautiful place of the Eastern Chitwan. It is close to the famous tourist place such as Saurah & Chitwan National Park (CNP).

== Agriculture and industry ==
The people inhabiting Pithuwa are mostly peasant farmers cultivating mainly food and cash crops such as rice, maize, wheat, beans, lentils, mustard and vegetables along with engaging in job. Maximum job holders are engaged in educational sector. One of the famous Noodle Industry of Nepal i.e. Smart Foods and Snacks Pvt. Ltd. popularly called as Yum Yum Noodles. This industry had been providing employment to many people of Pithuwa. There are many other small and big Bricks Industries too which also been producing and providing enormous jobs to residents of the Pithuwa.

== Entrepreneurship ==
In the last decade people of Pithuwa are engaged in entrepreneurship and business activities. This is due to changing of people's mentality towards business.

== Education ==
The people of Pithuwa are highly educated. The literacy rate is around 84% as in 2012. There are 6 secondary school and one higher secondary school named Jana Jagriti Higher Secondary School [जन जागृती उच्च. मा. बि.]. The students of this area depend upon Bharatpur, Nepal, Kathmandu and abroad for higher studies.
