= Bairiya =

Village in Chitwan

Bairiya बैरिया
- Village
- Location in Nepal
- Coordinates: 27.576178°N 84.531785°E
- Country: Nepal
- Zone: Narayani Zone
- District: Chitwan District
- Province: Bagmati
- Established: 1995

Government
  - Type: Municipality
  - Ward President: Kul Prasad Bhushal

Population (1991)Increased
  - Total: 2,936
  - Density: 1,200/km^{2} (3,100/sq mi)
- Time zone: UTC+5:45 (Nepal Time)
- Postal code: Bairiya https://maps.app.goo.gl/X2S9sbF7n2vRoHn98
- Area code: 056

Bairiya is a village in Ward No. 9 of Rajpur Municipality, Rautahat District, in the Narayani Zone of central Nepal. According to the 1991 Nepal census, it had a population of 2,936 people living in 527 households. Over the years, the population has grown, and most residents follow the Islamic religion. While literacy challenges remain, many people are actively working to improve education, and significant development initiatives are underway.

== Education ==
=== Schools ===
- Bairiya High School*

Madrasa Girls University

== Tourism ==
Bairiya is a neighbour of Akolwa and is close to Rajpur Farhadwa

Tourism place

- Lal Bakaiya Bridge
- Baandh

== Gallery ==
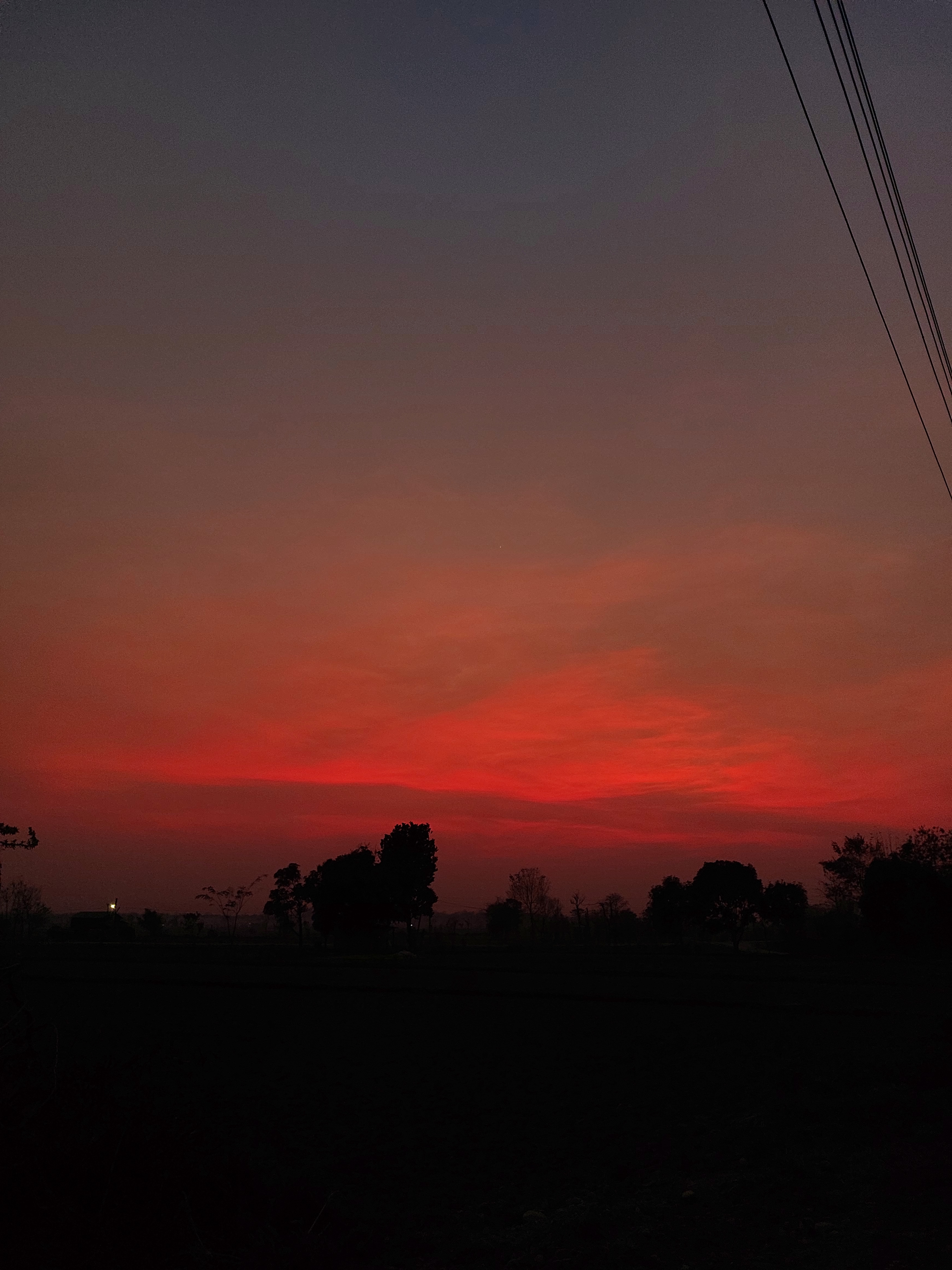
Sunset

== Sports ==
Loads of Cricket Enthusiast

=== Some past event ===
- Bairiya Premier League

== Notable people ==
- Rupak Sapkota, Software Developer & Tech Community Builder
- Surendra Pandey, Vice Chairman of CPN(UML)
- Azam Shaikh
