= Bharatpur Hospital =

Hospital in Chitwan, Nepal

Bharatpur Hospital भरतपुर अस्पताल

Geography
- Location: Bharatpur, Bagmati Province, Nepal

Organisation
- Type: Governmental

Services
- Emergency department: Yes
- Beds: 600

Helipads
- Helipad: No

History
- Former name: Shree Mahendra Aadharsha Chikitshalya

Links
- Website: bharatpurhospital.gov.com
- Lists: Hospitals in Nepal

Bharatpur Hospital (Nepali: भरतपुर अस्पताल) is a governmental hospital situated in Bharatpur Metropolitan City in Chitwan District of Nepal.

Following the 2026 Nepal floods, bodies swept downstream from the Trishuli River were recovered at Bharatpur Hospital, temporarily overwhelming the hospital's morgue.
