= Madi Kalyanpur =

Madi Kalyanpur माडी कल्याणपुर
- Village development committee
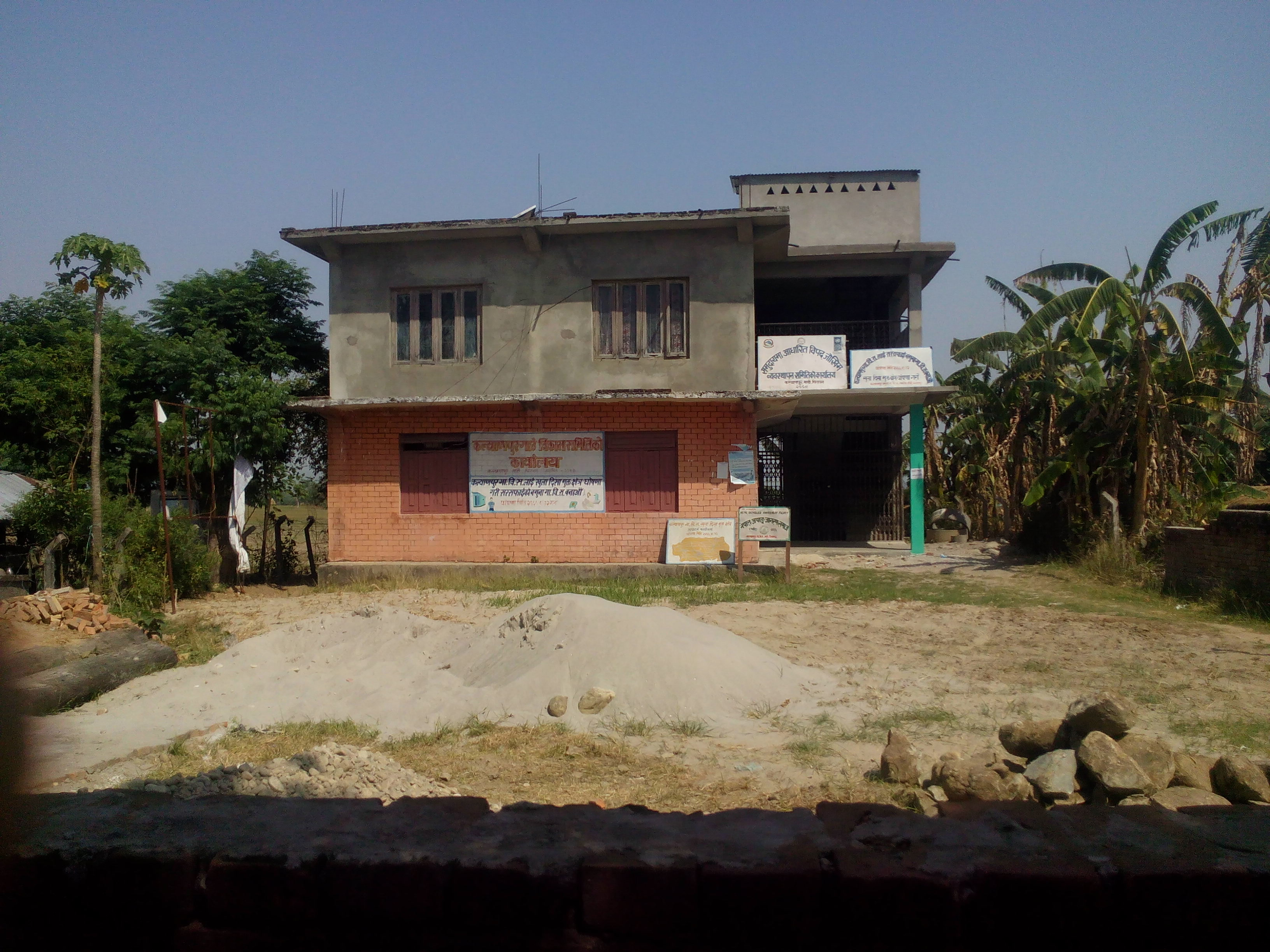

- Location in Nepal
- Coordinates: 27.43°N 84.34°E
- Country: Nepal
- Zone: Narayani Zone
- District: Chitwan District

Population (1991)
  - Total: 6,598
- Time zone: UTC+5:45 (Nepal Time)

Madi Kalyanpur is a village development committee in Chitwan District in the Narayani Zone of southern Nepal. At the time of the 1991 Nepal census it had a population of 6,598 people living in 1,238 individual households. Villages in the Madi Kalyanpur VDC include Gopalnagar and Kalyanpur. There has been a large community of Tharu people in the area for many years.
