= Sundarbasti =

Village in Nepal

Sundarbasti is a village in Nepal which is situated in the Chitwan District of Bagmati Province. It is in the 14th ward of Bharatpur, and is famous for Gaucharan as a football ground where wardleague is held in occasion of dashain, a festival of Hinduism. The primary occupation in the village is agriculture. It is connected to Bharatpur by Madithori highway. Sangam hatchery is situated here.

== Name ==
Sundarbasti is a compound word of Sundar (beautiful) and Basti (village).

== See also ==
- Chitwan
