= Mangalpur, Nepal =

Mangalpur मंगलपुर
- Village Development Committee
- Location in Nepal
- Coordinates: 27.67°N 84.35°E
- Country: Nepal
- Province: Bagmati Province
- District: Chitwan District

Population (1991)
  - Total: 12,969
- Time zone: UTC+5:45 (Nepal Time)

Mangalpur is a village in Chitwan District in the Bagmati Province of southern Nepal. Devichok is most interesting area. It was also a Village Development committee before it merged with Bharatpur. At the time of the 1991 Nepal census it had a population of 12,969 people residing in 2,580 individual households.

== Location ==
It lies 7 km west from the headquarters of the district. Narayani River flows on its northern part.
