= Meghauli Airport =

Airport in Bagmati Province, Nepal

- IATA: MEY; ICAO: VNMG

Summary
- Airport type: Public
- Owner: Government of Nepal
- Operator: Civil Aviation Authority of Nepal
- Serves: Bharatpur, Nepal; Chitwan National Park
- Elevation AMSL: 600 ft / 183 m
- Coordinates: 27°34′38″N 84°13′44″E

Map
- Location of airport in Nepal

Runways
Direction	Length		Surface
Direction	m	ft	Surface
08/26	1,085	3,560	Grass

Meghauli Airport (IATA: MEY, ICAO: VNMG) is a domestic airport located in Meghauli, Bharatpur serving Chitwan National Park in Bagmati Province in Nepal. The airport is the older of two airports in Bharatpur, the other one being Bharatpur Airport.

== History ==
The airfield was built in 1961, when Elizabeth II and Prince Philip visited Chitwan. In 1982, the first Elephant polo world cup was played on the airfield. After being closed for several years, the airport reopened in 2016 for charter operations and from 2017 to 2020, Nepal Airlines carried out scheduled operations again. In 2024, upgradation works started turning the grass runway into an asphalt one.

== Facilities ==
The airport resides at an elevation of 600 feet (183 m) above mean sea level. It has one runway which is 1,085 metres (3,560 ft) in length.

== Airlines and destinations ==
As of 2022, there are no scheduled services to and from Meghauli Airport. Previously Nepal Airlines operated routes to Kathmandu.

== Incidents and accidents ==
- On 25 April 1996, a Royal Nepal Airlines BAe 748 Series 2B overran the runway at Meghauli Airport, after a flight from Kathmandu, when landing in rain on the grass airstrip. The aircraft ran across some ditches, causing the nose gear to collapse. None of the four crew and 27 passengers were injured.
