= Kabilas, Chitwan =

Kabilas कविलास
- Metropolitan City ward
- Location in Nepal
- Coordinates: 27.79°N 84.48°E
- Country: Nepal
- Zone: Narayani Zone
- District: Chitwan District

Population (1991)
  - Total: 5,513
- Time zone: UTC+5:45 (Nepal Time)

Kabilas is a former village development committee in Chitwan District Now a part of Bharatpur Metropolitan City in the Bagmati Province of southern Nepal. At the time of the 1991 Nepal census it had a population of 5,513.
