= Patihani =

Patihani पटिहानी
- Village development committee
- Location in Nepal
- Coordinates: 27.59°N 84.36°E
- Country: Nepal
- State: Bagmati Pradesh
- District: Chitwan District

Population (1991)
  - Total: 8,798
- Time zone: UTC+5:45 (Nepal Time)

Patihani is a part of metropolitan Bharatpur in Chitwan District in Bagmati Province of southern Nepal. has gained popularity as a hidden gem for wildlife enthusiasts and nature lovers. Boasting abundant wildlife, scenic rivers, and providing similar facilities to Sauraha, another well-known tourism destination in Chitwan District, Patihani distinguishes itself by offering a more budget-friendly experience. At the time of the 1991 Nepal census it had a population of 8,798 people living in 1,752 individual households.
