= Korak, Nepal =

Korak कोराक
- Village development committee
- Location in Nepal
- Coordinates: 27.66°N 84.69°E
- Country: Nepal
- Zone: Narayani Zone
- District: Chitwan District

Population (1991)
  - Total: 9,621
- Time zone: UTC+5:45 (Nepal Time)

Korak is a village development committee in Chitwan District in the Narayani Zone of southern Nepal. At the time of the 1991 Nepal census it had a population of 4,320 people living in 752 individual households.
