= Tandi =

Tandi टाँडी
- City
- Tandi
- Nickname: Tandi Bazar
- Country: Nepal
- Zone: Narayani Zone
- District: Chitwan District

Government
  - Type: Municipality
  - Mayor: Pralad Sapkota
- Time zone: UTC+5:45 (Nepal Time)
- Postal code: 44204
- Area code: ⋅∗∗
- Website: https://www.ratnanagarmun.gov.np/en

Tandi is a city in the Ratnanagar municipality of the Chitwan District in Nepal. It lies on the eastern side of Chitwan district, at the entrance point of Sauraha Chitwan National Park, a UNESCO World Heritage Site.
