= Gitanagar =

Gitanagar गीतानगर Geetanagar
- Village development committee
- Location in Nepal
- Coordinates: 27.61°N 84.40°E
- Country: Nepal
- Province: Bagmati Province
- District: Chitwan District

Population (2011)
  - Total: 13,929
- Time zone: UTC+5:45 (Nepal Time)

Gitanagar was a former village development committee in Chitwan District in Narayani zone of Nepal. At the time of the 2011 Nepal census it had a population of 13,929 people (6,553 male; 7,376 female) living in 3,375 individual households.

The town was named after "Geeta Rani" during the Rapti Land Distribution Project which occurred in the early 1950s. Gitanagar was divided into nine wards. Wards in Gitanagar include Uzzolnagar, Prithibinagar, Champanagar, Devnagar, Amarbasti, Kesharbhag, Geetangar, Parasnagar, and Indrapuri. Currently Gitanagar lies inside Bharatpur Metropolitan city ward number 6.
