= Kathar, Nepal =

Kathar कठार
- Village development committee
- Location in Nepal
- Coordinates: 27.58°N 84.61°E
- Country: Nepal
- Zone: Narayani Zone
- District: Chitwan District
- Municipality: Khairahani Municipality

Population (1991)
  - Total: 8,247
- Time zone: UTC+5:45 (Nepal Time)

Kathar is a village development committee [recently included in Khairahani Municipality] in Chitwan District in the Bagmati Province of southern Nepal. At the time of the 2001 Nepal census it had a population of 8,247 people living in 1,326 individual households.
