= Balkumari College =

School in Narayangarh, Chitwan, Nepal

- बालकुमारी कलेज
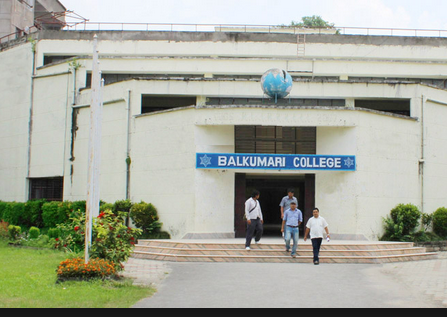
- Type: Public Campus
- Established: 1986
- Affiliations: TU
- Location: Narayangarh, Chitwan, Nepal
- Language: English, and Nepali
- Website: www.balkumaricollege.edu.np

Balkumari College (Nepali: बालकुमारी कलेज) is an educational institution of higher learning, located in Narayangarh, Chitwan, Nepal. It was established on 18 September 1986. Balkumari College is affiliated to Tribhuwan University for bachelor's and master's degree.

== Courses offered ==
- Bachelor in Science in Microbiology, Bachelor in Environmental Science, Bachelor in Hotel Management, Bachelor in Information and Technology Management, Bachelor in Business Studies, Bachelor in Education, Bachelor in Education Information Communication Technology, Bachelor in Business Administration
- Master in Business Studies(MBS), Master in Business Administration (MBA-FM) & Master in Education (M.Ed.)

Health Programs: H.A.

== Affiliations and Partners ==
- Tribhuvan University Kathmandu
- World Bank
- University Grants Commission, Sanothimi, Bhaktapur
- Peacecrops Nepal
- Chaudhary Group of Industries
- Lions Clubs International
- Gonoshasthaya Kendra, Savar, Bangladesh
- Nepal Family Health Project
- State University of Bangladesh, Dhaka
- California State University, Fullerton
- State University of California, San Bernardino
- PUM (ex experts’ team of the Netherlands, the Hague)
- Mumbai University, Mumbai, India
- Delhi University, New Delhi
- Pune University, Pune, India
- Goa University, Goa, India
- Microbiologist's Society, India
- Winrock International, VTA program, (Farmer to Farmer)
- American Center, Kathmandu
- Narayangarh Chamber of Commerce & Industries
- PHD Chamber of Commerce and Industry, New Delhi, India
- Research Division, Tribhuvan University
- Family Planning Association of Nepal
- love Green Nepal, Nara Devi, Kathmandu, Nepal
- Nepal AOTS Alumni Society, Kathmandu, Nepal
