= Kaule, Chitwan =

Kaule काउले
- Village development committee
- Location in Nepal
- Coordinates: 27.77°N 84.65°E
- Country: Nepal
- Zone: Narayani Zone
- District: Chitwan District

Population (1991)
  - Total: 3,931
- Time zone: UTC+5:45 (Nepal Time)

Kaule is a village development committee in Chitwan District in the Narayani Zone of southern Nepal. At the time of the 1991 Nepal census it had a population of 3,931 people living in 732 individual households.
