= Piple, Chitwan =

Piple पिप्ले
- Village development committee
- Location in Nepal
- Coordinates: 27.60°N 84.70°E
- Country: Nepal
- Zone: Narayani Zone
- District: Chitwan District

Population (1991)
  - Total: 8,260
- Time zone: UTC+5:45 (Nepal Time)

Piple is a village development committee in Chitwan District in the Narayani Zone of southern Nepal. At the time of the 1991 Nepal census it had a population of 8,260 people living in 1,555 individual households.
