= Mugling =

Mugling मुग्लिङ
- Town
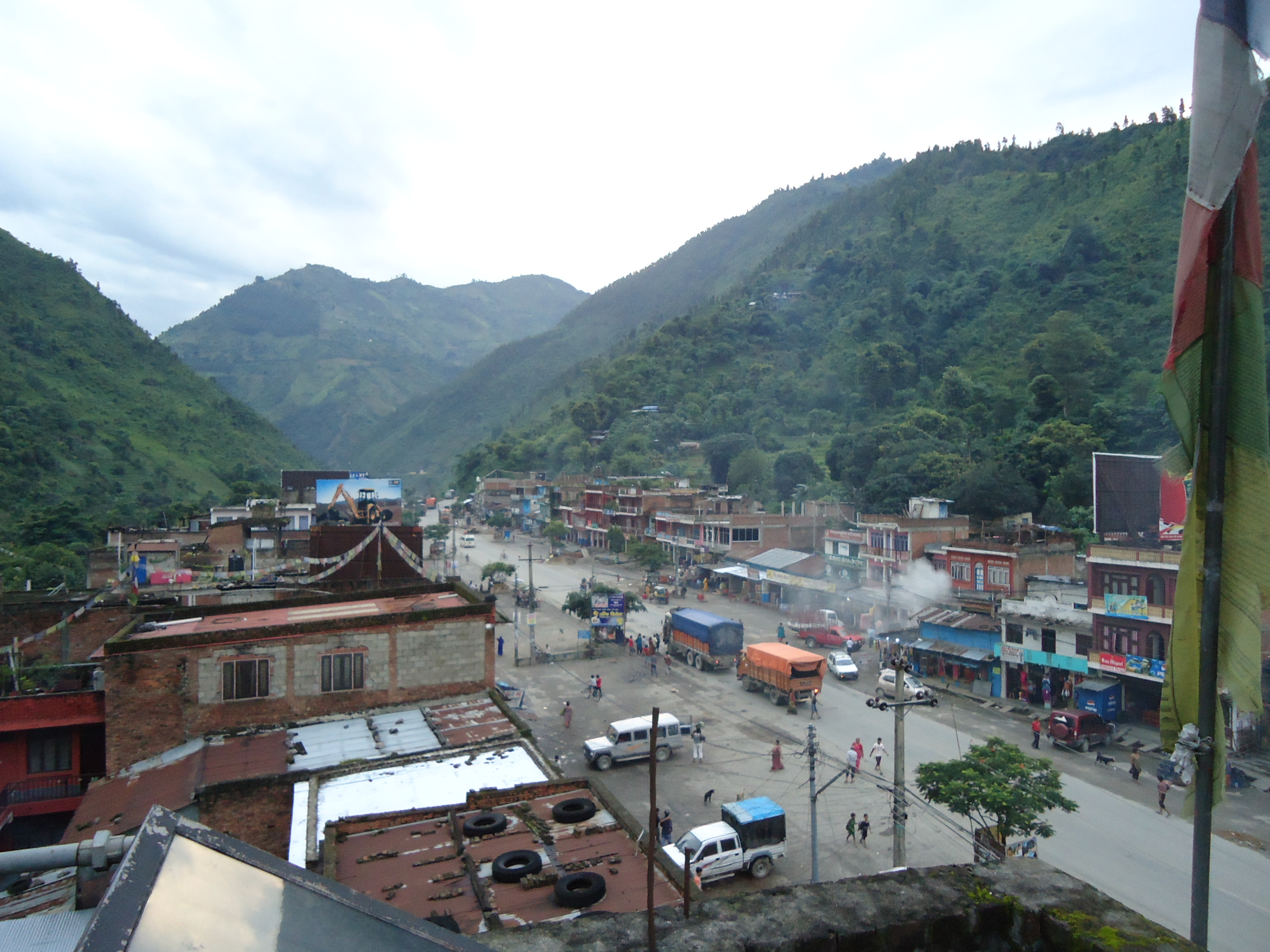
- Mugling in 2010

- Location within Bagmati Province Location within Gandaki Province Location within Nepal
- Coordinates: 27.85712630356841°N 84.56045946773389°E
- Country: Nepal
- Province: Bagmati
- District: Chitwan

Government
  - Type: Town council
  - Body: Ichchhakamana Rural Municipality
- Time zone: UTC+5:45 (Nepal Time)

Mugling (Nepali: मुग्लिङ; sometimes known as Muglin) is a town in Chitwan, Bagmati Province, Nepal.

Mugling is located at an interchange of two majors highways: Prithvi and Madan Ashrit Highway (also known as Mugling-Narayanghat Highway). Before the 1970s, Mugling was a fishing village at the confluence of Marshyangdi River and Trishuli River. Soon after the two highways were connected, the town saw a major transformation and became synonymised as a "town that never slept".

In 2005, it was reported that Mugling became a ghost town due to the Nepalese Civil War, rising violence, and crime. During the war, the Nepal government had installed an army checkpoint at the market.
