= Chandi Bhanjyang, Chitwan =

Chandi Bhanjyang चण्डीभञ्ज्याङ
- Village development committee
- Location in Nepal
- Coordinates: 27.82°N 84.57°E
- Country: Nepal
- Province: Bagmati Province
- District: Chitwan District

Population (2011)
  - Total: 4,978
- Time zone: UTC+5:45 (Nepal Time)

Chandi Bhanjyang is a village development committee in Chitwan District in Bagmati Province of southern Nepal. At the time of the 2011 Nepal census it had a population of 4,978 people (2,460 male; 2,518 female) living in 487 individual households.
