= Chepang people =

Chepang
चेपाङ
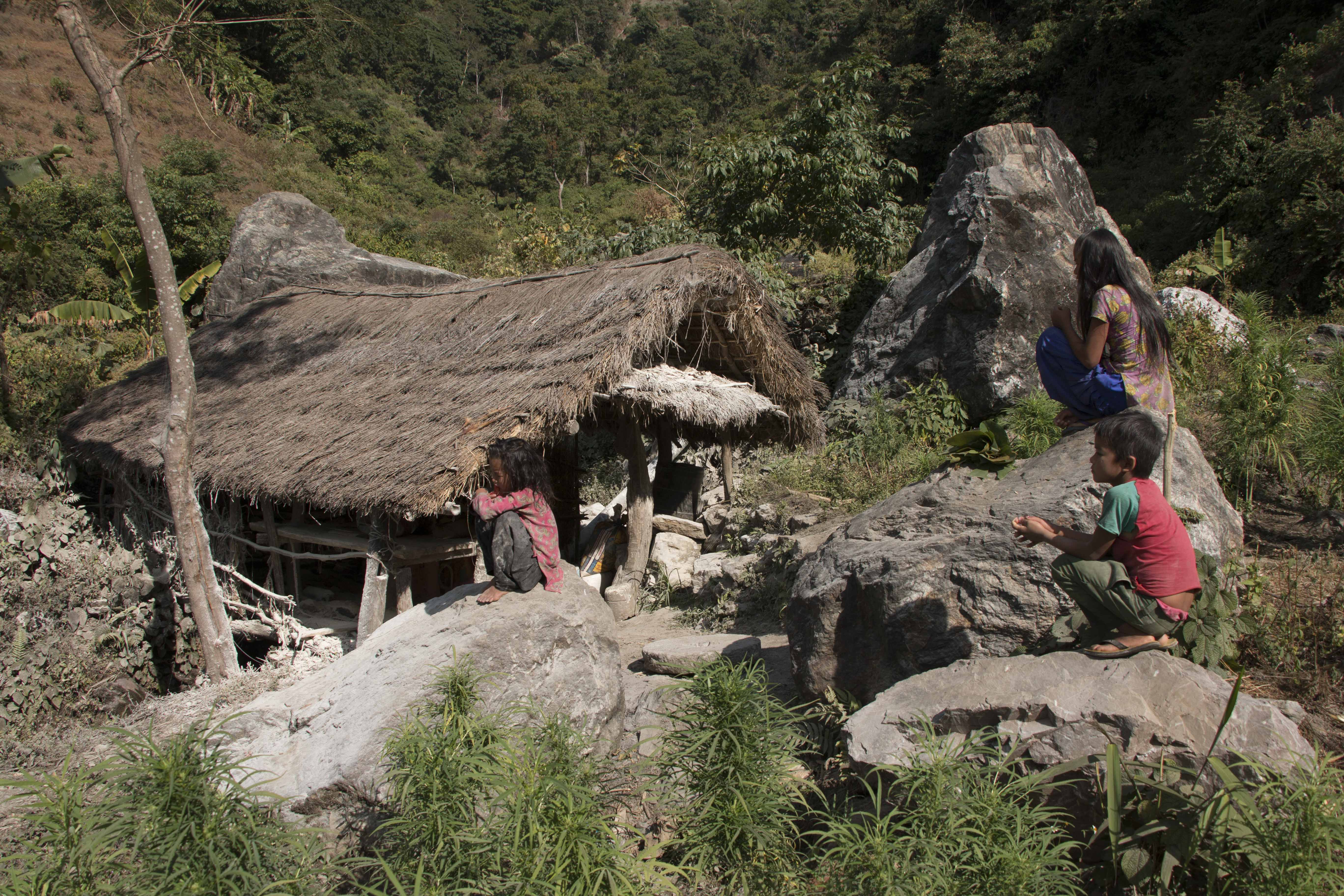
- Chepang children

Total population
- 84,364

Regions with significant populations
- Nepal

Languages
- Chepang • Nepali

Religion
- Hinduism 64.5% • Christianity 25.5% • Prakriti 9.7%

Related ethnic groups
- Bhujel, Tibetans, Mongols

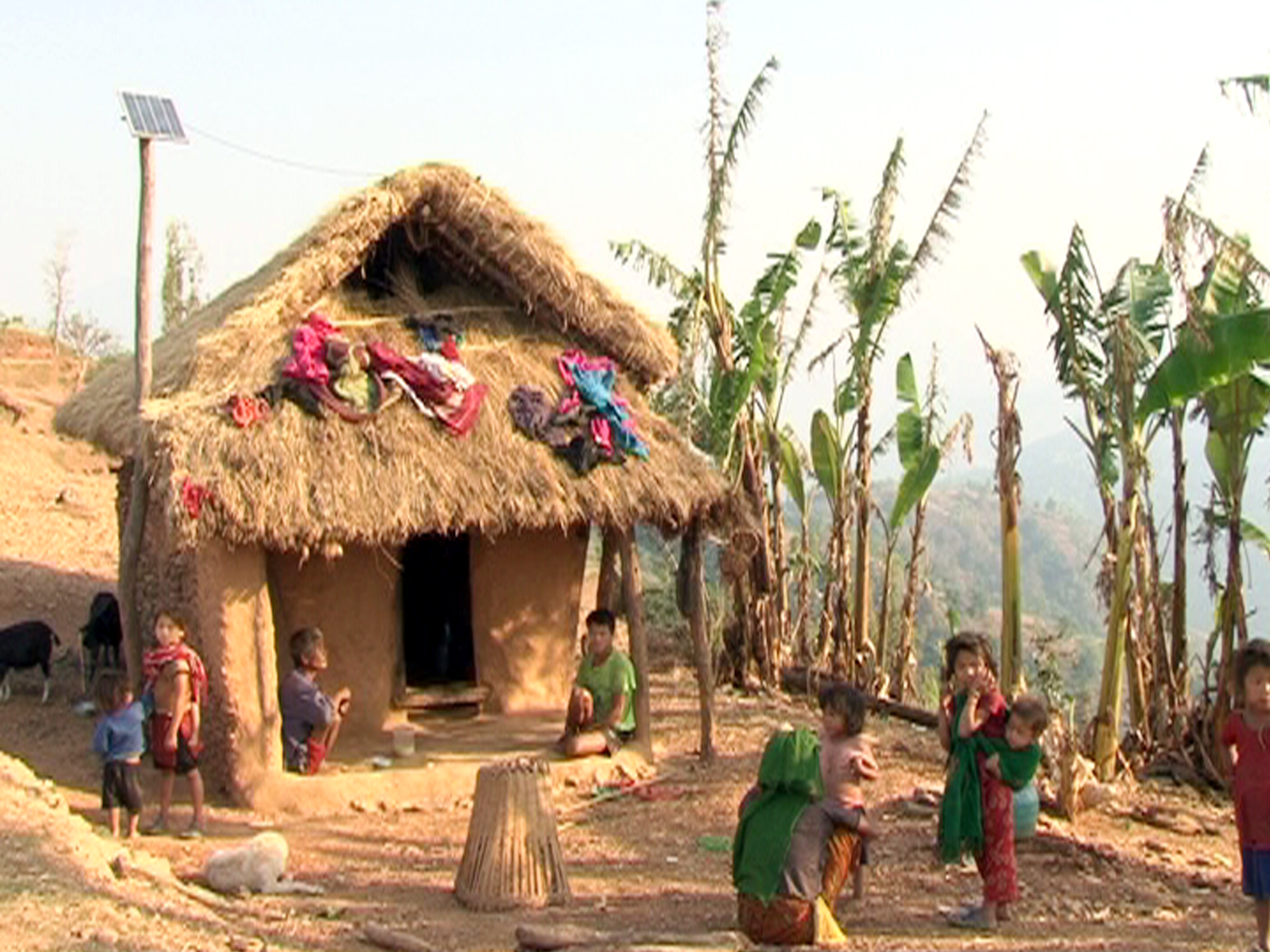
A typical Chepang home in Makwanpur District, Nepal

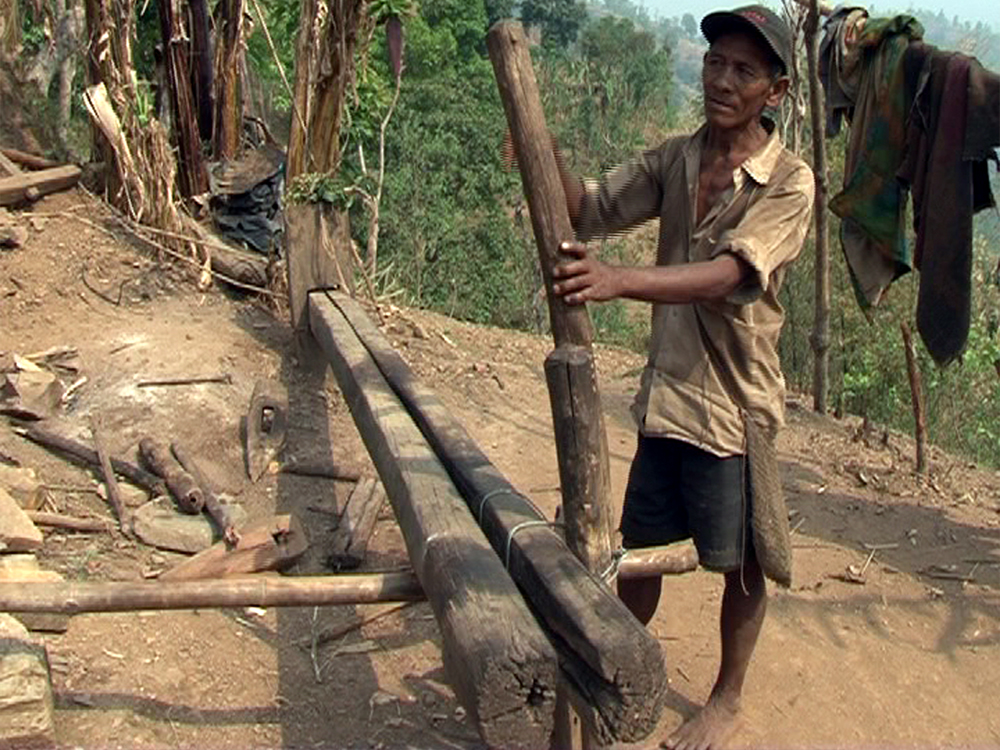
A traditional device used by Chepang to extract oil from Chiuri seeds

The Chepang (Nepali: चेपाङ जाति), also known as Chewang, are a Tibeto-Burman ethnic group from the rugged ridges of the Mahabharat mountain range of central Nepal.

With increasing populations, lack of arable land and few irrigation options, malnutrition has been a historic problem for the Chepang despite forest supplements. The Chepang have often been characterized as the poorest of Nepal's poor. Forced teenage pregnancies are common. Chepang men and women are basically egalitarian and no social ranking exists as it does in caste Nepalese society. Many Chepang cannot read and write due to a lack of education beyond elementary school, and this illiteracy stands in contrast to the great gains Nepal has been making in reducing illiteracy. They are mostly located in Bagmati Province (Dhading District, Chitwan District, and Makwanpur District) and Gandaki Province (Gorkha District and Tanahun District).

== Geographical distribution ==
The 2011 Nepal census classifies the Chepang within the broader social group of Mountain/Hill Janajati. At the time of the 2011 Nepal census, 68,399 people (0.3% of the population of Nepal) were Chepang. The frequency of Chepang people by province was as follows:

- Bagmati Province (1.2%)
- Gandaki Province (0.2%)
- Koshi Province (0.0%)
- Lumbini Province (0.0%)
- Madhesh Province (0.0%)
- Karnali Province (0.0%)
- Sudurpashchim Province (0.0%)

The frequency of Chepang people was higher than national average (0.3%) in the following districts:

- Chitwan (5.0%)
- Makwanpur (4.6%)
- Dhading (4.3%)
- Gorkha (1.3%)

== Livelihood ==
Over the past two or three generations, the Chepang have begun to slowly shift from a semi-nomadic (slash-and-burn) lifestyle to a more settled way of life, relying increasingly upon the production of permanent fields of maize, millet and bananas. The severe topography, however, has made permanent farming difficult (and usually insufficient), and the forest has remained an important (although decreasingly so) source of food for the Chepang. Historically, the collection of wild yams and tubers, fish caught from nearby rivers, bats and wild birds, and periodically wild deer hunted from nearby forests, have supplemented their need for carbohydrates and protein.

== Religion ==
According to the 2011 Nepal Census, there are almost 70,000 Chepang in the country, of which 65% were Hindu and 25% were Christian and 10% were animist. The Chepangs themselves follow Animism, although they are strongly influenced by both Hinduism and Buddhism, which came from the Tamangs just north of them. They observe all the Hindu festivals of Dashain, Tihar and Sakranti besides their own tribal festival Nwagi or Chhonam, which is performed on a Tuesday during third week of Bhadra (some day in August and September). Chhonam is the auspicious day for eating a new crop. Before the celebration of this festival, eating certain agricultural products is prohibited.

In the 5th National Gathering of Chepang, 2004, it was stated they practiced Prakriti (Nature), with ancestor worship as most important. They worship many deities including Bhumi, Aita Bare, Gaidu, Namrung (earth deity) etc. They also observe other different festivals like, Maghe Sakranti, Saune Sakranti, Dashain, Tihar.

In recent years, many of the Chepang have converted to Christianity.

== Language ==
The language is also known as Chepang but is called Chyo-bang by the people themselves. These people are also called Praja meaning "political subjects". The people speak 3 different dialects of this Tibeto-Burman language that is closely related to Raute and Raji, two undocumented languages spoken in western Nepal. Chepang is one of the few languages which uses a duodecimal (base 12) counting system rather than the decimal (base 10).

== 2015 earthquake and political crisis ==
Chepang are among the most vulnerable due to the combination of April 2015 Nepal earthquake and 2015 Nepal blockade. More than 50 per cent of the people killed were from marginalised communities ranked low in the Human Development Index (HDI). Chepang communities were already suffering from severe malnutrition before the blockade, along with the Tamang. Due to historic discrimination and neglect and remote communities, Chepang have suffered discrimination even at the hands of the Nepali Food Corporation in charge of emergency food distribution. It is said that Chepangs compulsorily eat rice during Dashain, where meat is often eaten by more wealthy groups, but they are unlikely to afford even rice this year (2015). Hence they are among the most vulnerable ethnic groups facing potential population bottleneck in the winter of 2015/16 despite their already small numbers.
