= Chitwan District =

District in Bagmatti Pradesh, Nepal

Chitwan चितवन
- District
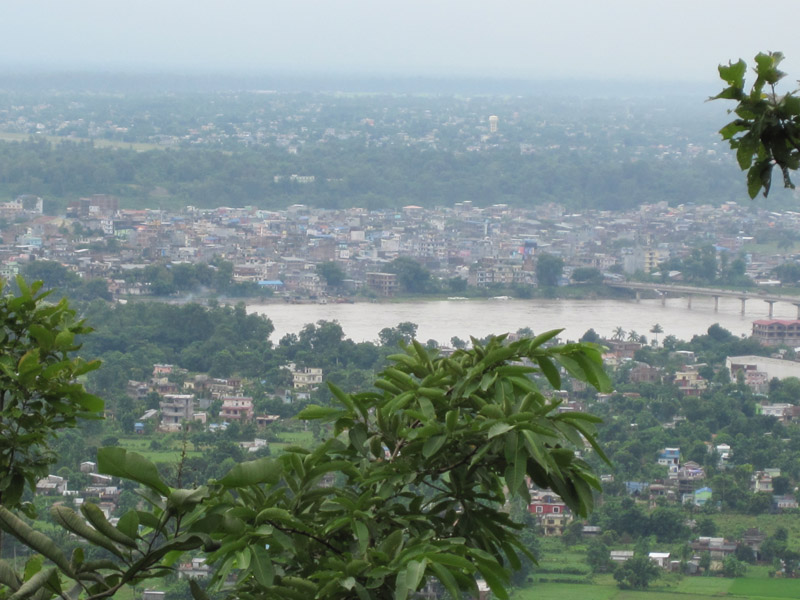
- Narayangarh city view from Maula Kalika temple Gaindakot
- Motto: हाम्रो चितवन, राम्रो चितवन
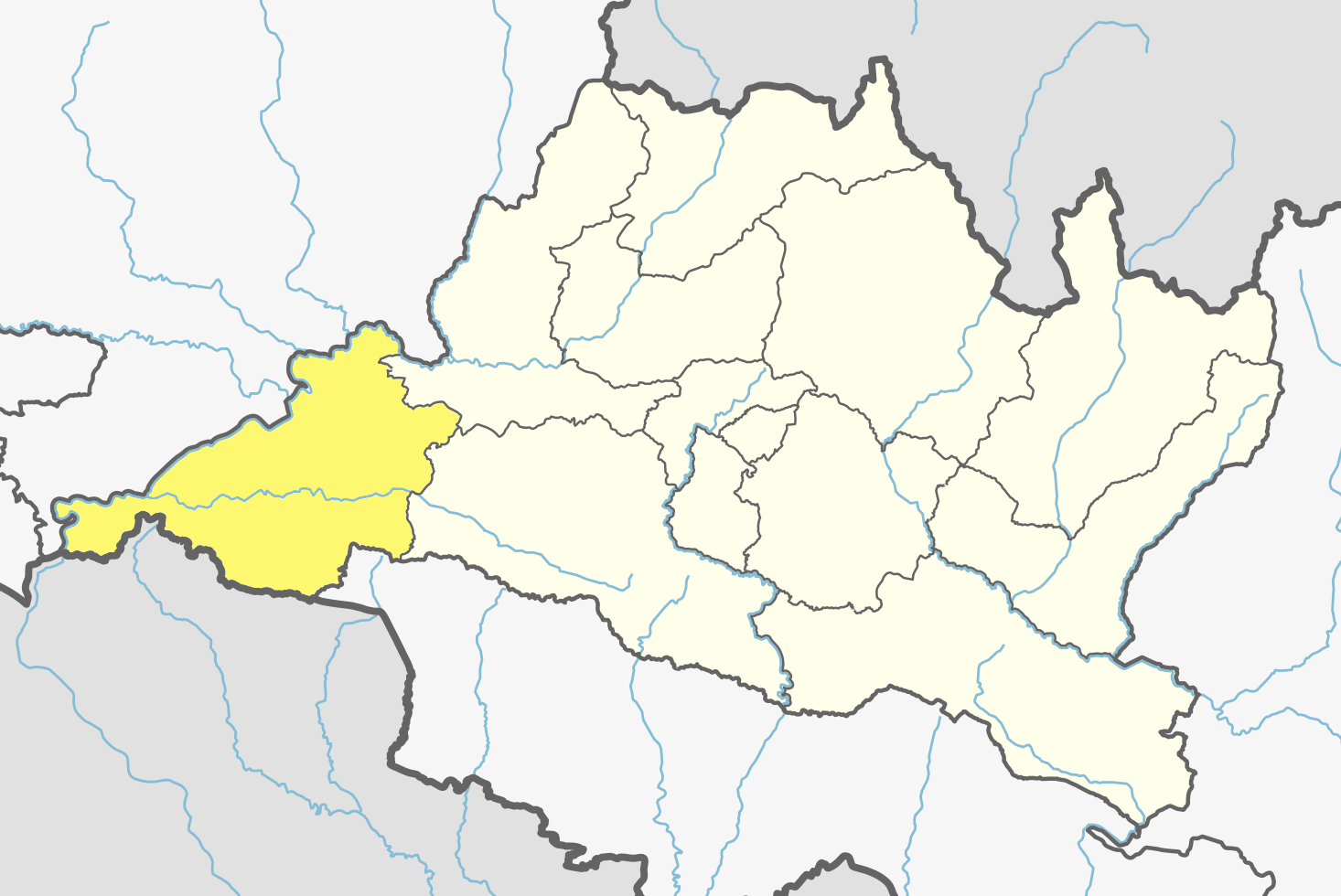
- Location in Bagmati Province
- Interactive map of Chitwan
- Coordinates: 27°35′N 84°30′E
- Country: Nepal
- Province: Bagmati Province
- Headquarters: Bharatpur
- HDI: ▲0.520 (Medium)
- HPI: ▼31.9 (Low)
- Literacy Rate: ▲77.3% (Medium)
- Established: 14th century

Area
  - Total: 2,238.39 km^{2} (864.25 sq mi)
- Elevation: 415 m (1,362 ft)

Population (2014)
  - Total: 579,984
  - Density: 259.108/km^{2} (671.086/sq mi)
  - Ethnicities: Tharu Brahmin Chhetri Newar Darai Muslim Gurung Magars Tamang Chepang Pariyar
  - Religions: Hindu Muslim Buddhist Christian

Languages
  - Local: Nepali, Tharu, Newari, Tamang, Gurung, Darai, Bhojpuri, Magar, Chepang
  - Official: Nepali
- Time zone: UTC+5:45 (Nepal Time)
- Area code: 056
- Website: www.ddcchitwan.gov.np

Chitwan District (/ˈtʃɪtəˌwʌn/, Nepali: चितवन, [ˈtsit̪ʌwʌn]) is one of seventy-seven districts of Nepal, and takes up the southwestern corner of Bagmati Province which covers 2,238.39 km^{2} (864.25 sq mi), and in 2011 had a population of 579,984 (279,087 male and 300,897 female) people. Bharatpur is its administrative centre which is the commercial and service centre of South Central Nepal and a major destination for higher education, health care and transportation in the region. Chitwan lies in the Terai region of Nepal. It is in the drainage basin of the Gandaki River and is roughly triangular, taking that river as its meandering northwestern border, and a modest watershed border, with India, as the basis of its southern limit. Local government: Bharatpur Metropolitan, Rapti Municipality, Ratnanagar Municipality, Kalika Municipality, Khairahani Municipality, Madi Municipality, Ikshyakamana Gaupalika.

== History ==
The district takes its name from the Chitwan Valley, one of Nepal's Inner Terai valleys between the Mahabharat and Siwalik ranges, both considered foothills of the Himalayas.

Chitwan is one of the few remaining undisturbed vestiges of the Terai region, which formerly extended over the foothills of Nepal. It was originally a dense forest with wild animals like leopards and Bengal tigers. It was ruled by Chitrsen Baba and rishis meditated in the forest.

== Etymology ==
There are several theories on the origin of the name Chitwan:

- The name Chitwan is a composite of the Sanskrit words चित्त, transliterated "citta" meaning heart, and वन, transliterated "vana" meaning jungle or forest. Thus, the meaning of Chitwan is Heart of the Jungle.
- Chitwan was a dense forest ruled by the Tharu God-King Chitrasen Baba, thought to an incarnation of Vishnu. Today, the Tharu worship his idol during HariBodhini Ekadashi in Chitrasari en route to the village of Sauraha. Ban (वन) is the local word for a forest, according to this theory, the area was called Chitra Ban (Chitrasen's forest) which then became Chitwan.
- The Chitwan forests were populated by leopards and Bengal tigers and, since the Tharu term for a leopard is Chitri, the area became Chitwan.
- Chitra is also the Tharu word for religious drawings. You can see lots of Chitra in Tharu traditional house and, hence, "Chitra ban" became Chitwan.

== Religious sites ==
- Valmiki Ashram
- Shivaghat
- Devghat
- Bikram-Baba Temple
- Krishna Mandir Temple
- Sitamai Temple
- Umbrella Street

== Agriculture and industry ==
The people inhabiting the Chitwan District are predominantly peasant farmers cultivating mainly food and cash crops such as rice, maize, wheat, beans, lentils, mustard and Vegetables. The district is the major maize-producing area in Nepal, with an area under maize cultivation of 27,170 ha (104.9 sq mi) in the year 2003–04. Maize is cultivated on irrigated /seasonal irrigated land in winter and spring, and on rain fed land in summer. Because it is easily accessible by good roads, maize produced in the district can be easily distributed to other parts of the country. Poultry is also a significant industry in Chitwan.

Chitwan is famous in Nepal for mustard growing and production of mustard oil. This popularity of the mustard in Chitwan is attributed to the predominant soil type silt, resulting from the flooding of the Narayani River and its tributaries. The land of Chitwan is also spotted with clay, which is very good for growing rice, wheat and vegetables such as cabbage, cauliflower, radish, potatoes, broccoli, cucumbers, pumpkins, sweet potatoes and carrot. Chitwan is also famous for floriculture, mushroom cultivation and bee keeping.

Chitwan has adopting the South Korean New Community Movement model of development. One of the biggest rice mills in Nepal, Agam Food Industry, is situated in Bharatpur and is a big source of local employment.

== Cuisine ==
Chitwan is known for Taas (Nepali: तास), a spicy fried goat meat dish served with bhuja or chiura. Momo, Bhuteko Bhat (fried rice), and sukuti are other popular dishes. Dal bhat (steamed rice and lentils), is the staple food of the area, though meat and dairy products are also consumed. Other popular cuisines include Newari and Tharu and Thakali and Madheshi. For centuries, traditional fermented foods and beverages have constituted about 20% of the local diet. Depending on altitudinal variation, finger millet, wheat, buckwheat, barley, vegetable, rice, potato, and soybeans etc. are grown.

== Gallery ==
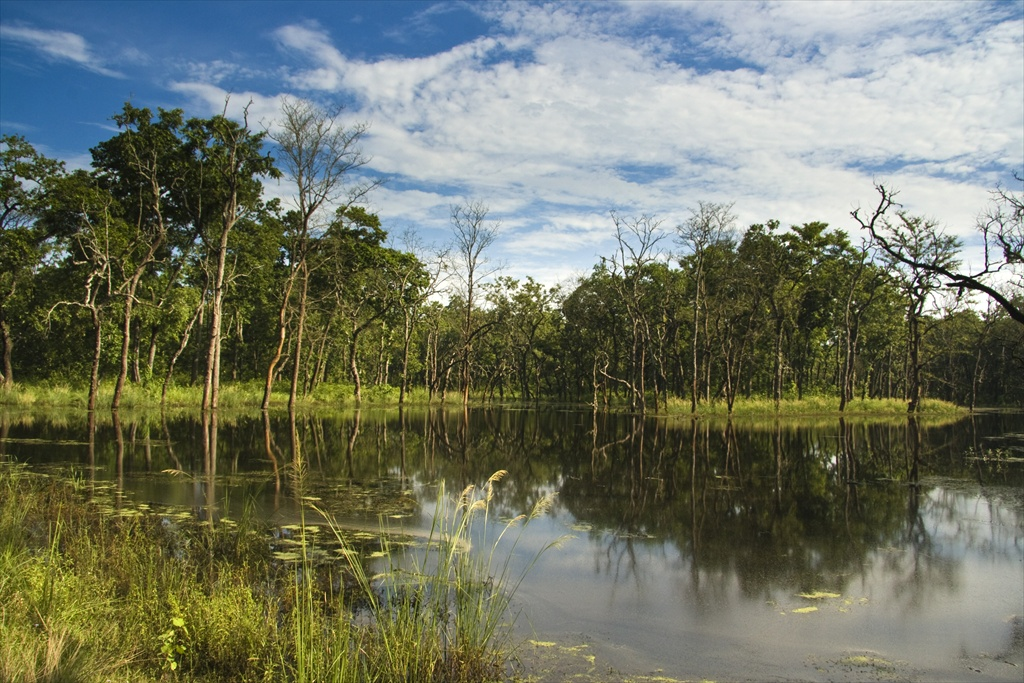
Beeshazar Lake near Chitwan National Park

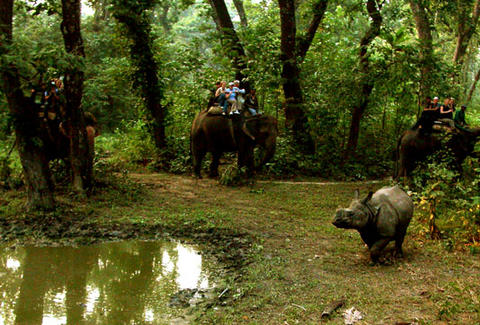
Chitwan National Park, elephant safari after an Indian rhinoceros

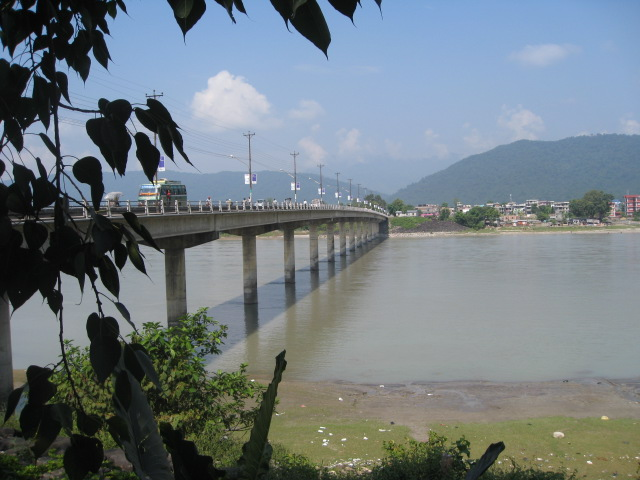
Narayani bridge in Narayangarh, Chitwan, Nepal

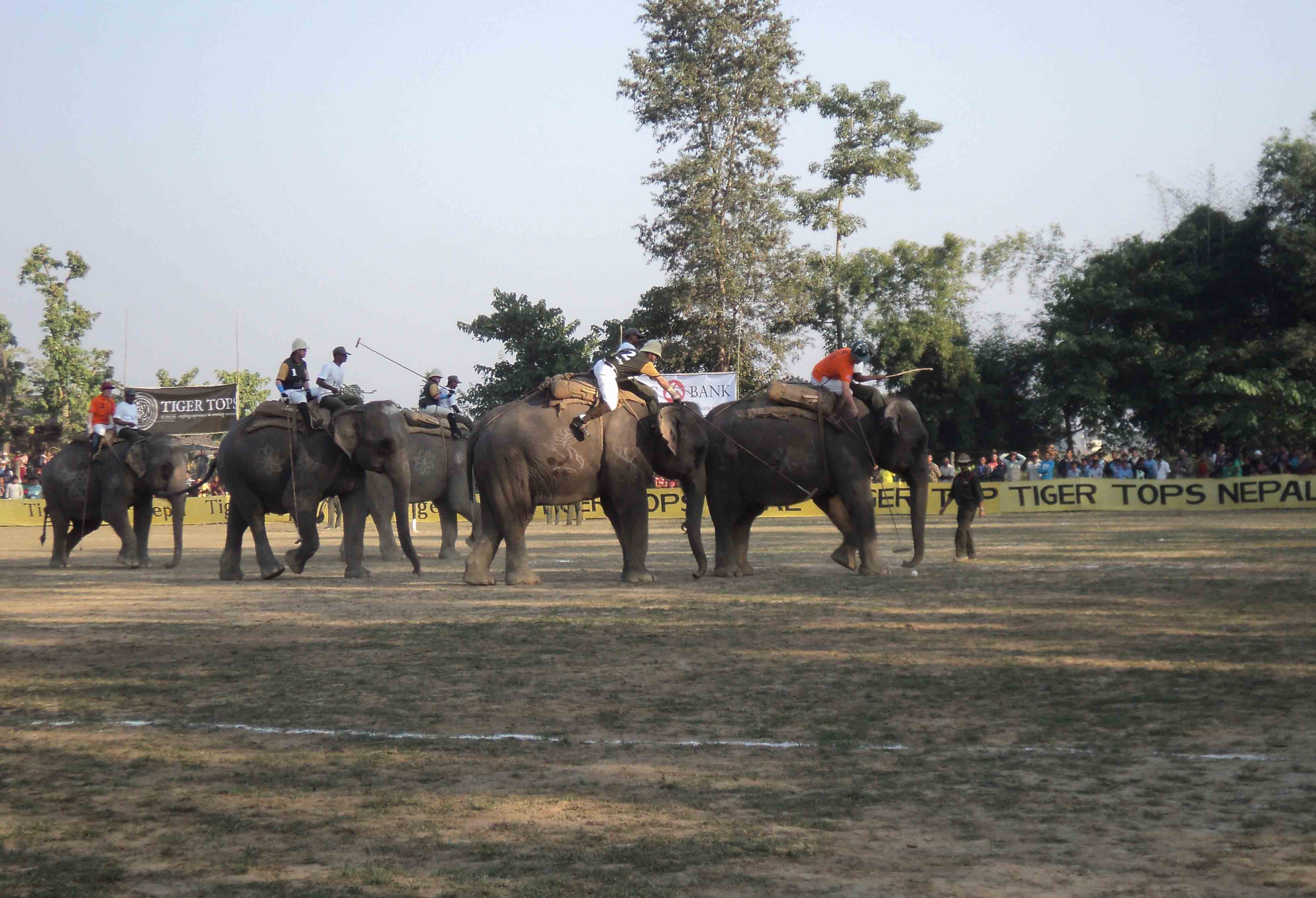
Elephant polo World cup 2012 in Meghauli, Nepal

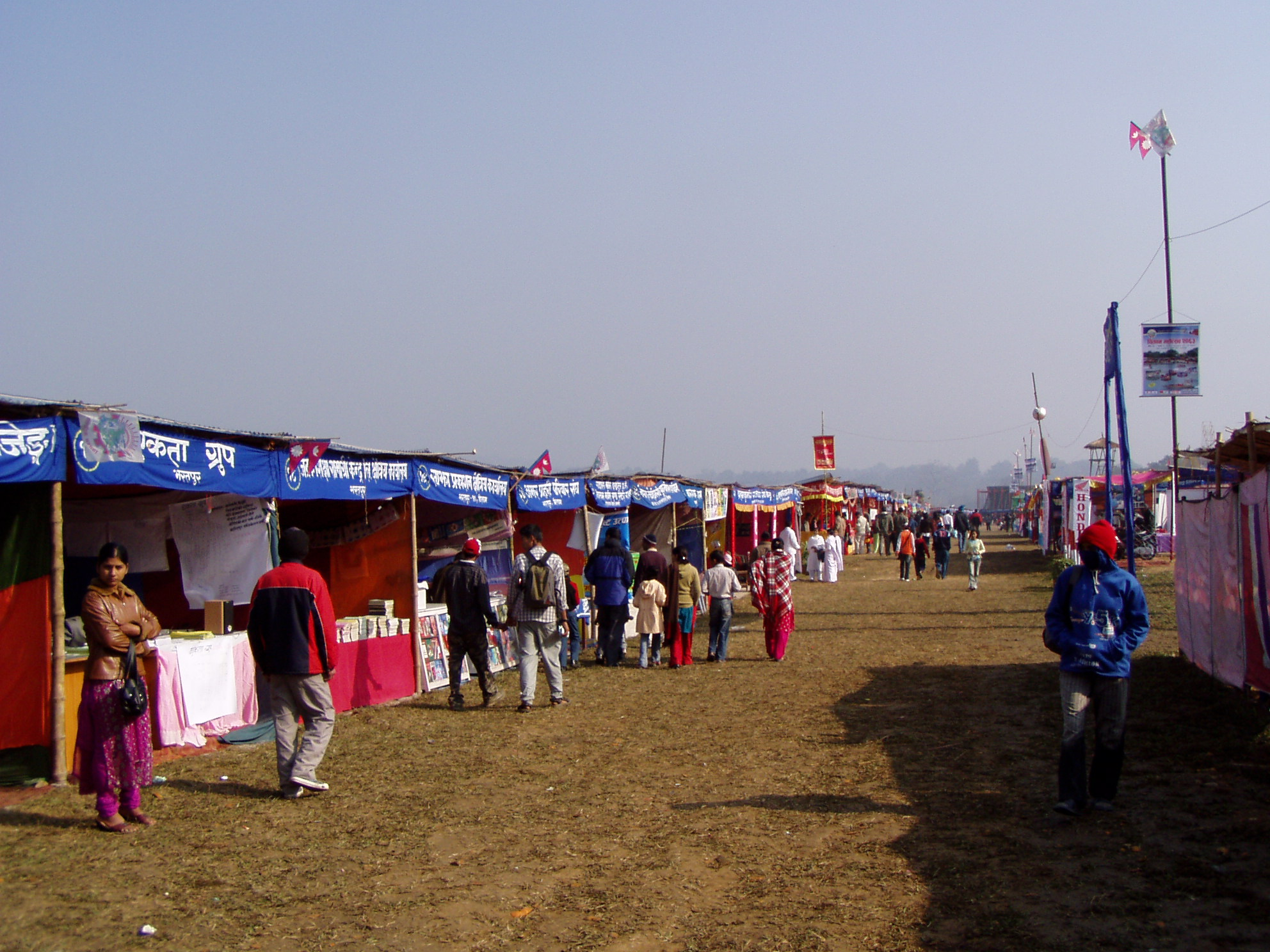
Chitwan Mahotsav 2063 (Chitwan Mahotsav 2007 A.D.) in Narayangarh, Chitwan

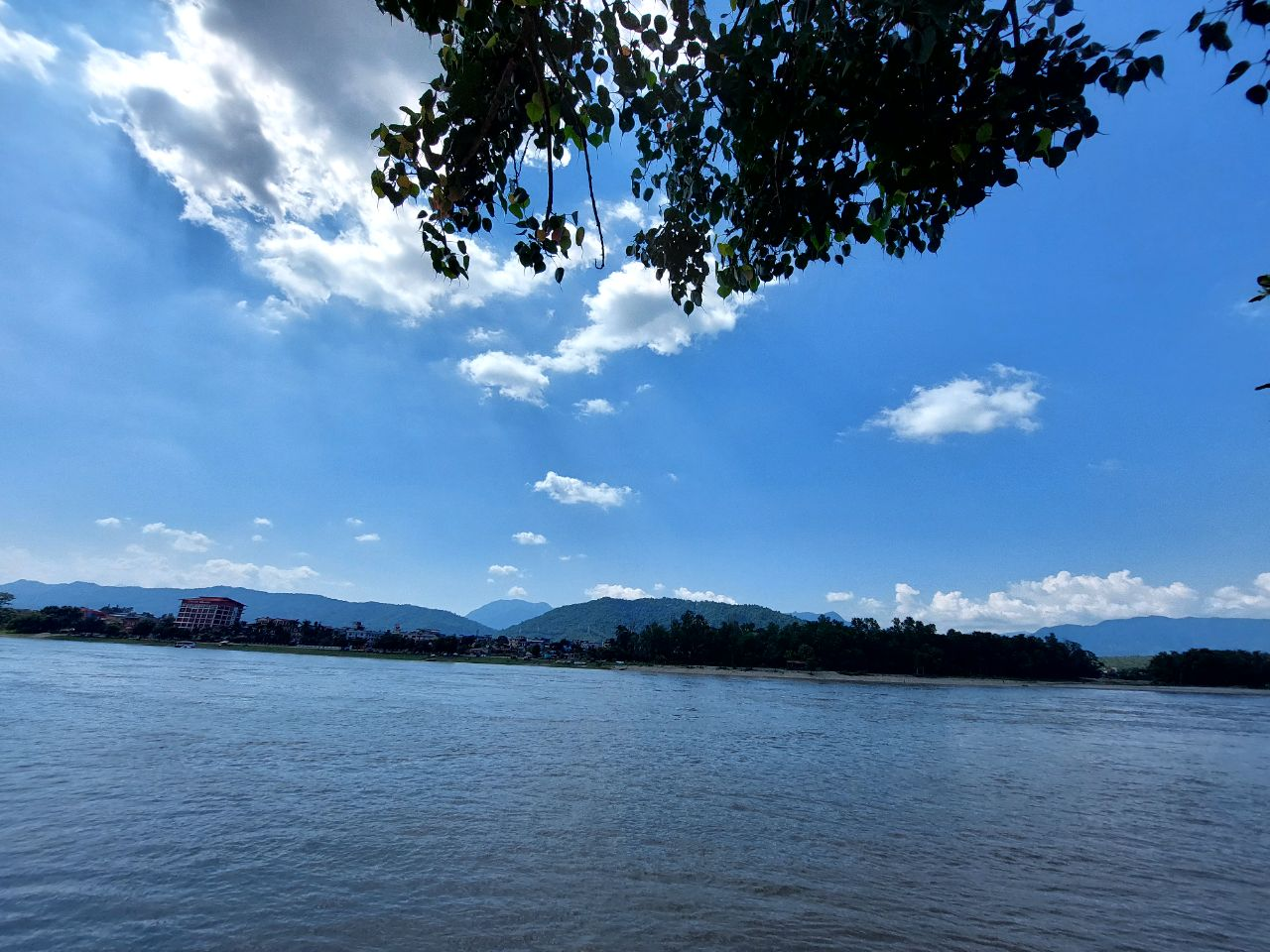
Narayani River

== Geography ==
The Rapti River flows east to the southwest in the south of Bharatpur and forms the northern border of the Chitwan National Park. The Narayani River flows north to south to the west of Bharatpur. It is the deepest and one of the biggest rivers in Nepal. The Narayani Bridge over the river connects Chitwan District with Nawalparasi District of Nepal.

Chitwan is particularly rich in flora and fauna. Nepal's first national park, the Chitwan National Park together with the adjacent Parsa National Park support a diversity of species that is much higher than elsewhere on the Indian subcontinent. Rare species include Bengal tiger, gharial, rhino, leopards, mugger crocodile, Indian rock python and several species of deer. The protected areas are guarded by a battalion of the Nepal Army and patrolled by anti-poaching units. Bishazari Tal ("20 Thousand") Lake is near Chitwan National Park, about 5 km (3.1 mi) south of Bharatpur. The lake is an important bird-watching center.

Krishna Mandir is One of the nice temples of the Hindu religion of Nepal. This is the temple of the god Krishna. There is no statue of the god in this temple. Its interior is made of mirrors all over the wall. The historical event of the god Krishna is shown on the wall. There is one place inside where there is a statue of the god Krishna and his wife.

== Transportation and communication ==
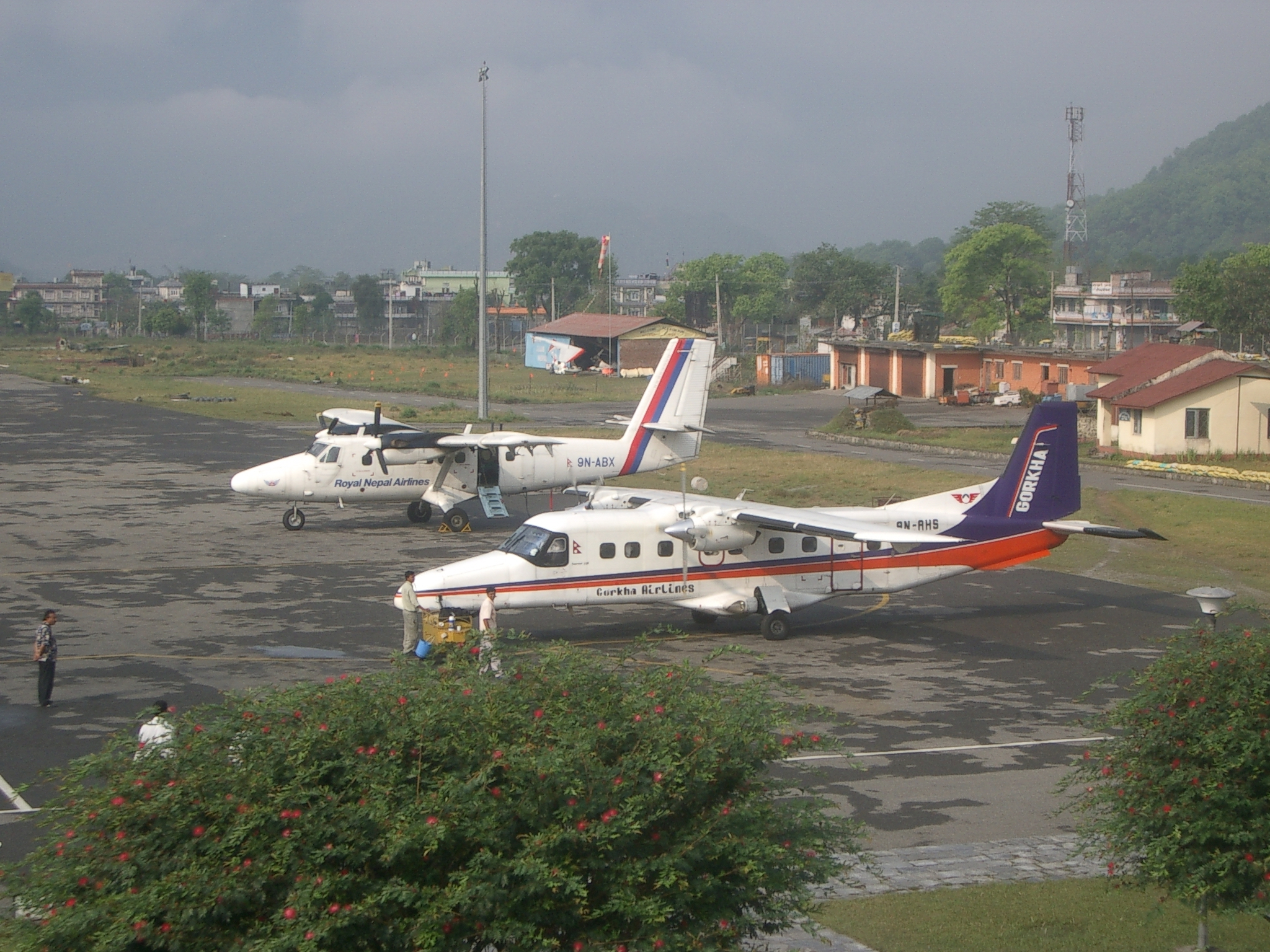
Bharatpur Airport

Bharatpur Airport is the only airport in the region and has flights to and from Kathmandu. Mahendra Highway, the main east–west highway in Nepal, runs through the region and, Prithvi Highway a north–south highway from the border with India to Kathmandu runs through the district. Narayangarh is the main transit point for vehicles travelling via the east–west Mahendra Highway and also for people travelling from Kathmandu, Gorkha, and Pokhara through Mugling.

There are numerous local FM radio stations broadcasting from Bharatpur: Synergy FM, Hamro FM, Radio Triveni, Radio Madi, Radio Chitwan, Radio Kotagiri, Chitwan Online FM, Kalika Music FM, Kalika FM. and Narayani FM. Television channels include Beso Channel, Aviyan Channel, Unique Television and Avass Television. There are multiple private Internet service providers. Fibre connectivity and 4G internet is available in the larger cities.

== Landmark buildings ==
- Upardanghari fort, in the old headquarters of Chitwan district, is believed to have been built by Satrubhanjan Shah, the son of Prince Bahadur Shah to defend the newly founded Kingdom in the 17th century.
- Kasara Durbar is an old palace built by the Rana Regime inside Chitwan National Park. Currently, it serves as the park office and museum.
- Diyalo Bangala Palace (Aptari Bharatpur) was the spring season palace used by the Shah Dynasty of Nepal. This palace was built by late king Mahendra Bir Bikram Shahdev to rest in during winter season. It is located on the banks of Narayani River in Bharatpur Municipality ward no. 2.
- DAO Building Bharatpur: This old building was built in the period of shifting the headquarters from Upardangghari. Now is used as an office of the chief district officer.
- Bharatpur Covered hall: Hall in guesthouse of Bharatpur for indoor games.
- Umbrella Street. This street has about 480 colourful hanging umbrellas that provide a serene atmosphere for guests.Top Umbrella Streets to Explore in Nepal

== Geography and climate ==
Climate Zone	Elevation Range	% of Area
Lower tropical	below 300 m (980 ft)	58.2%
Upper tropical	301 to 1,000 m (988 to 3,281 ft)	32.6%
Subtropical	1,001 to 2,000 m (3,284 to 6,562 ft)	6.7%

== Major places ==
- Gondrang
- Ayodhyapuri
- Dibyanagar
- Bharatpur
- Narayangarh Bazaar
- Tandi bazaar
- Parsa Bazaar
- Parsadhap Bazaar
- Birendranagar Bazaar
- Muglin Bazaar
- Rampur Bazaar
- Gitanagar bazaar
- Bhandara Bazaar
- Chanauli Bazaar
- Mangalpur Bazaar
- Manakamana
- Shivanagar bazaar
- Basantapur Bazaar, Madi
- Patihani bazaar
- Parbatipur Bazaar
- Saradanagar bazaar
- Jagatpur Bazaar
- Meghauli-Telauli Bazaar
- Lothar Bazaar
- Sauraha
- Kasara
- Dasdhunga
- Krishna Mandir
- Tarauli
- Jhuwani
- Bairiya
- dhurba bazaar

== Demographics ==
Historical population
Census year	Pop.	±% p.a.
1981	259,571	—
1991	354,488	+3.17%
2001	472,048	+2.91%
2011	579,984	+2.08%
2021	722,168	+2.22%
Source: Citypopulation

At the time of the 2021 Nepal census, Chitawan District had a population of 719,859. 7.01% of the population is under 5 years of age. It has a literacy rate of 83.68% and a sex ratio of 1046 females per 1000 males. 683,634 (94.97%) lived in municipalities.

Castes/ethnic groups in Chitawan District (2021)
1. Bahun (27.6%)
2. Chhetri (11.6%)
3. Tharu (10.1%)
4. Tamang (7.53%)
5. Gurung (6.92%)
6. Magar (5.74%)
7. Kami (5.07%)
8. Chepang (4.95%)
9. Newar (4.92%)
10. Damai (2.16%)
11. Kumal (1.58%)
12. Sarki (1.50%)
13. Darai (1.23%)
14. Muslim (0.97%)
15. Other Hill Janjati (3.12%)
16. Madheshi non-Dalit (2.44%)
17. Other Khas non-Dalit (1.15%)
18. Others (1.51%)

Ethnicity wise: Khas were the largest group, making up 40% of the population. Hill Janjatis are the second-largest group, making up 31% of the population. Tamangs were the largest Hill Janjatis, with Magars being 11% of the population. Chhetri and Bahun made up 20% of the population.

Languages of Chitawan district (2021)
1. Nepali (67.8%)
2. Tharu (9.52%)
3. Tamang (4.94%)
4. Chepang (3.32%)
5. Gurung (3.24%)
6. Magar (3.22%)
7. Bhojpuri (2.48%)
8. Nepal Bhasha (2.03%)
9. Darai (1.02%)
10. Others (2.44%)

As their first language, 67.79% of the population spoke Nepali, 9.52% Tharu, 4.94% Tamang, 3.32% Chepang, 3.24% Gurung, 3.22% Magar, 2.48% Bhojpuri, 2.03% Nepal Bhasha and 1.02% Darai as their first language. In 2011, 70.1% of the population spoke Nepali as their first language.

Religion in Chitawan District (2021)
Religion	Percent
Hinduism	81.43%
Buddhism	12.48%
Christianity	4.19%
Islam	1.33%
Other or not stated	0.57%

Religion: 81.43% of the population is Hindu, 12.48% Buddhist, 4.19% Christian and 1.33% Islam.

== Administration ==
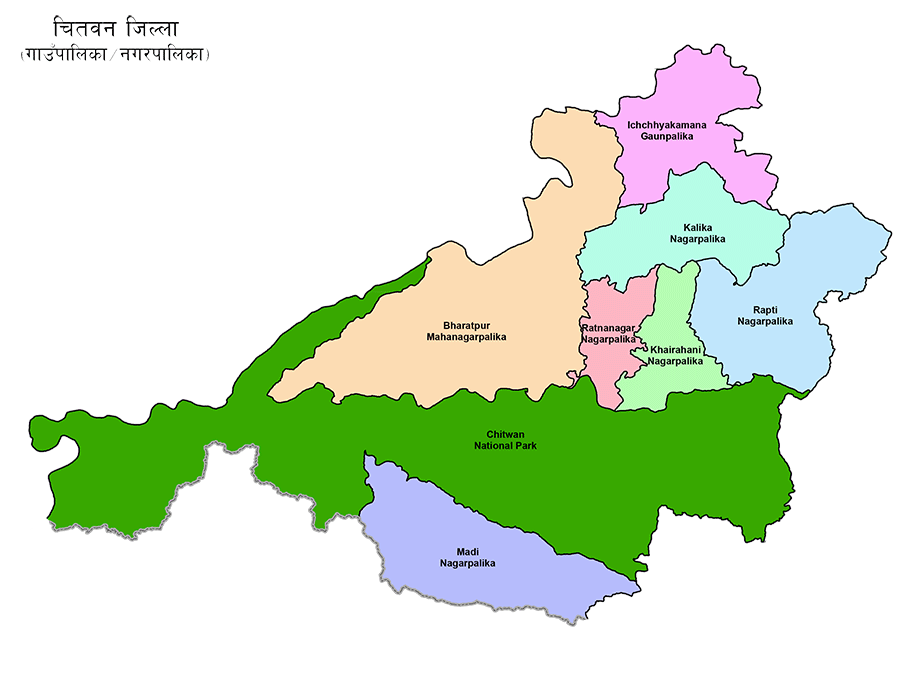
Map of municipalities of Chitwan District

The district consists of seven municipalities, out of which one is a metropolitan city, five are urban municipalities and one is a rural municipality.

- Bharatpur Metropolitan City
- Kalika Municipality
- Khairahani Municipality
- Madi Municipality
- Ratnanagar municipality
- Rapti Municipality
- Ichchhakamana Rural Municipality

=== Former municipalities and gaunpalikas ===
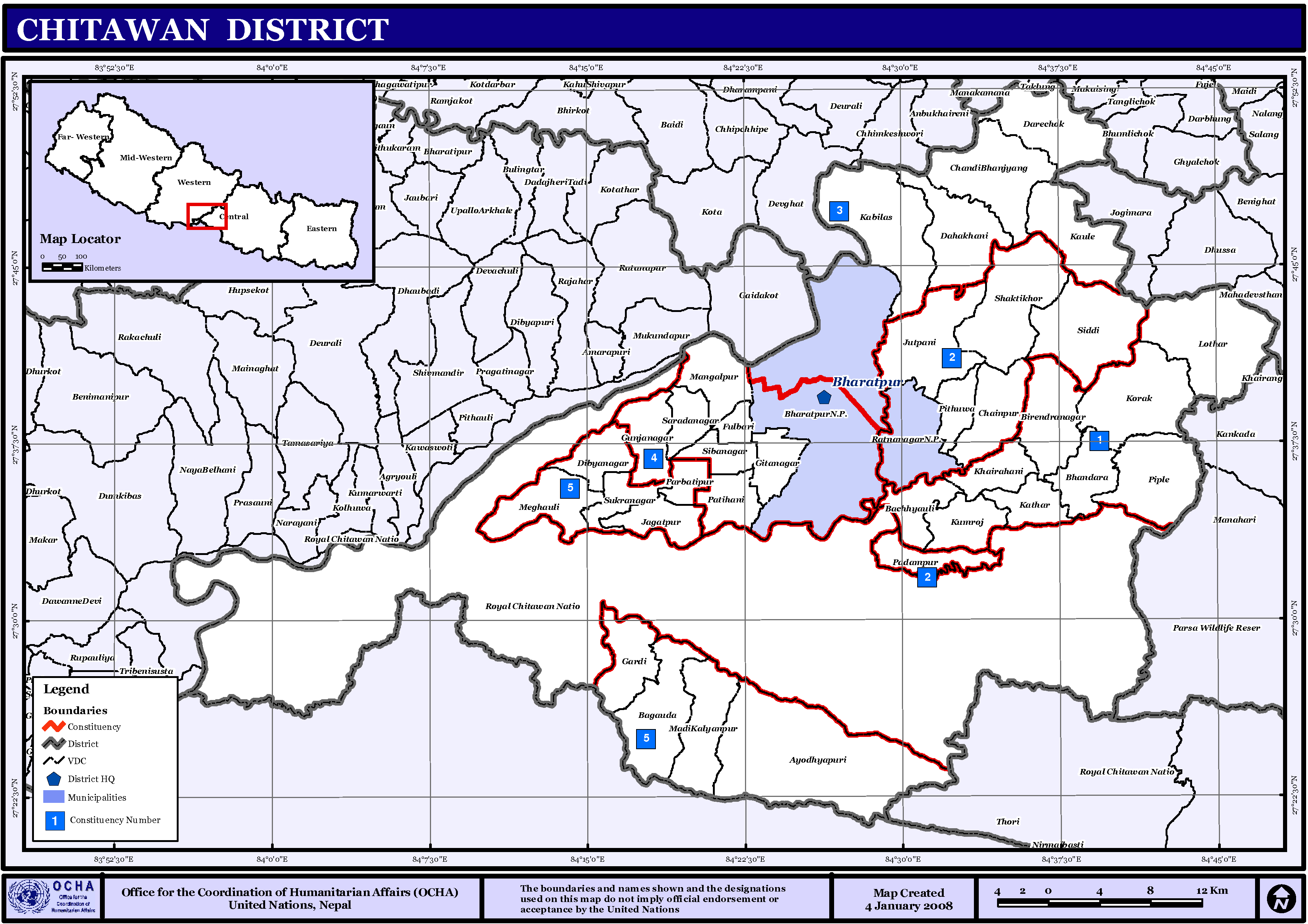
Map of the VDC/s in Chitwan District

Prior to the restructuring of the district, Chitwan had following gaunpalikas and municipalities.

- Ayodhyapuri
- Bagauda
- Bharatpur Metropolitan
- Chandi Bhanjyang
- Dahakhani
- Gardi
- Kalika Municipality
- Kabilas
- Kathar
- Kaule
- Khairhani municipality
- Korak
- Lothar
- Madi Municipality
- Madi Kalyanpur
- Mangalpur
- Narayanpur
- Piple
- Ratnanagar municipality
- Rapti Municipality
- Siddi

== Health care ==
Chitwan district is known for its hospitals and has many top rated medical institutions, mostly in and around Bharatpur Municipality.Bharatpur is colloquially known as medical city of Nepal. The district is especially known for the B. P. Koirala Memorial Cancer Hospital at Krishnapur and two of the reputed medical colleges of the nation;College of Medical Sciences, Bharatpur and Chitwan Medical College. Chitwan ranks only behind the capitalKathmandu, in terms of hospital facilities in Nepal. Medical facilities in the district also include Bharatpur Hospital, a part of the Bharatpur medical college; Chitwan Eye Hospital; Sairam Dental Hospital and Research Center; Maula Kalika Hospital; and Narayani Community Hospital.

== Educational institutions ==
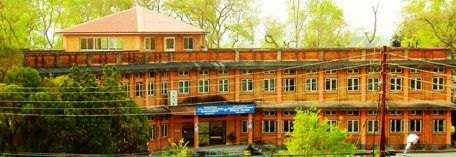
Institute of Agriculture and Animal Science, Rampur

Most of the educational institutions in this region provide quality education to the students from Chitwan and neighboring districts too. These schools and colleges focus on the development of skills and knowledge of their students. Among them:

- Aroma English Secondary School, Bharatpur 10
- Balkumari College is located near the Narayangadh Bharatpur Height and affiliated to Tribhuvan University.
- Balikumari College, Narayangarh, Chitwan
- Birendra Multiple Campus is the oldest campus of the city, located in Bharatpur heights.
- Buddha Shanti Higher Secondary School, Rapti Municipality 03
- Chitwan Higher Secondary School, Bharatpur-10 * shree arunodaya higher secondary school, bharatpur 6 geetanager
- Institute of Agriculture and Animal Science, also known as the Rampur Agriculture Campus, is the agriculture institution under Tribhuvan University, and is the main institution in the fields of agriculture and veterinary science in Nepal. Occupying a huge area, this campus has been declared a university, the Agriculture and Forestry University.
- Secondary School Gawai, Gawai, Khairahani 13
- Aadikabi Bhanubhakta Secondary School, Narayangarh, bharatpur - 1
- Apex Educational Academy, a higher secondary school in Bharapur
- Apex academy in Kshetrapur
- Birendra higher secondary school
- Boston International College, Hakim chowk, Bharatpur-10 (affiliated to Pokhara University)
- Central English Boarding School
- Chitwan Health Foundation and Research Center was established in Bharatpur as the nursing School of Chitwan Hospital and Health Foundation
- Chitwan Hotel Training Center in Bharatpur
- Chitwan Medical College and Research Centre, Dipendranagar, Bharatpur
- Chitwan Science College and Orchid Science College
- College of Medical Sciences: a 700-bed teaching hospital in Dipendranagar, Bharatpur.
- Crystal College, Ratnanagar
- Daisy English Higher Secondary Boarding School, Khairahani - 4, Parsa
- Divya Jyoti Basic School, Harnari, Khairahani 13
- Gawai Secondary School, Khairahani 13, Gawai
- Grandee English Boarding School, Bharatpur-19
- Himalayan Secondary English Boarding School, Ratnanagar-1, Bakulahar
- Holy Vision Public School, Yagyapuri, Bharatpur-4
- Indreni ICT college, affiliated to Tribhuvan University, located at Muktinagar, Bharatpur
- International college is a college of higher education and runs the HSEB and TU affiliated BBS and MBS programs in management streams.
- Jan Aadrash multiple campus Birendranagar is the public campus in Birendranagar ward no. 2.
- Jana Jagriti Higher Secondary School, Pithuwa – 3, Pithuwa
- Kalika English Boarding School
- Kamal Devi English School
- Kankali Secondary School, Khairahani - 1
- Lead Academy for Science and Management Technology
- Little Flower English school, Belchowk
- Little Stars Secondary English Boarding School. Bharatpur 7, Krishnapur
- Madi secondary school, Madi-3 Basantapur
- Maiya Devi Girls College, Dipendranagar, Bharatpur
- Nepal Police School Bharatpur-14
- New Capital College
- Paragon Secondary School, Ratnanagar-10, Chitwan
- Polar Star Secondary English School, Bharatpur-8, Chitwan
- Pragati Shiksha Sadan, East Rampur, Chitwan
- Prembasti Secondary School, Bharatpur 7 Prembasti
- Prerana Higher Secondary School
- Presidency college in Dipendranagar
- SOS Hermann Gmeiner Higher Secondary School
- Sagarmatha Secondary Boarding School, Ratnanagar
- Saheed Smriti Multiple campus, Shantichowk is the biggest campus of eastern Chitwan.
- Sainik Awashiya Mahavidhyalaya Chitwan, operated by Nepal army welfare fund, provided education in high school level.
- Saptagandaki Multiple Campus is the largest public campus in the city, located in Dipendranagar ward no. 10, Bharatpur.
- School of Health Science
- Shanti Academy college in Bharatpur
- Shanti Vidya Mandir English School, Bharatpur-11, Chitwan
- Shree Medical and Technical College located in Bharatpur is affiliated to the Purbanchal University and CTEVT.
- Shree Prembasti Higher Secondary School, Bharatpur-7, Chitwan
- Shree Sharadpur Higher School
- Sirjana English Secondary School, Located behind Central Bus Terminal (Paras Buspark)
- Skyrider boarding school, ra.na.pa-13, ameliya
- Small heaven School
- Someshwor higher secondary school Madi-01 Baruwa
- Sun Rise English school, Bharatpur 10
- Valmiki Shiksha Sadan Higher Secondary School provides higher secondary education
- Xavier college in Bel chowk
- SOS Hermann Gmeiner School Bharatpur, Bharatpur-8, Chitwan
- shree arunodaya higher secondary school, bharatpur 6 geetanagar chitwan.

Source: Center for Education and Human Resource Development

== Notable people ==
- Pushpa Kamal Dahal (Prachanda): Prime Minister of Nepal 2008–09 and 2016–17; chairman of UCPN
- Nilkantha Upreti: Former Chief Election Commissioner of Nepal
- Surendra Pandey: Former Finance Minister of Nepal
- Ram Bahadur Thapa (Badal): Former Home Minister of Nepal
- Bikram Pandey Former minister of Nepal and current house of representative from Chitwan 3
- sagar ale singer representative from Chitwan
- Shristi Shrestha: Miss Nepal 2012
- Shiva Regmi: Nepalese Film director
- Bodhraj Acharya: Nepalese scientist
- Kamal Bahadur Adhikari: Nepalese weightlifter
- Dr. Santosh Kalwar: Nepalese poet, writer, and computer researcher (first English language novelist of Chitwan)
- Swopnil Sharma: Lead singer of The Shadows Nepal Band
- Sandeep Lamichhane: Cricketer
- Sushant Subedi: Analyst/Economist
- Asmi Shrestha: Miss Nepal 2016
- Nirmal Purja: Nepalese Mountaineer
- Lalmani Chaudhary : 2008 House of representatives from Chitwan 1 (constituency)

== See also ==
- Ayodhyapuri
- Sundarbasti
- Sushant Subedi
- Notary and Translation Service in Bharatpur - Notary Nepal
- Atma Gyan Wild Yoga and Safari AtmaGyan Wild Yoga and Safari is a family-run yoga retreat center and homestay located in Meghauli, Chitwan, Nepal. The retreat combines traditional yoga and meditation practices with wildlife safari experiences in and around Chitwan National Park, a UNESCO World Heritage Site. The name "AtmaGyan" translates to "self-knowledge" or "knowledge of the soul" in Sanskrit.
