= Chepang language =

Sino-Tibetan language spoken in Nepal

Chepang
- च्योःबाङ्
- The word "Chepang" written in Devanagari script
- Region: Nepal
- Ethnicity: Chepang
- Native speakers: 59,000 (2021 census)
- Language family: Sino-Tibetan: Chepangic; Chepang
- Writing system: Devanagari

Language codes
- ISO 639-3: cdm
- Glottolog: chep1245
- ELP: Chepang
- Most spoken languages in Nepal. Chepang in 23.

- Chepang is classified as Vulnerable by the UNESCO Atlas of the World's Languages in Danger.

Chepang is a language spoken by approximately 59,000 people in South-Central Nepal. The people are known as Chepang. In 2003, Randy LaPolla proposed that the Chepang may be part of a larger "Rung" group. Another group who speaks Chepang, living across the Gandaki river, call themselves Bujheli.

== Geographical distribution ==
Chepang is spoken in the following districts of Nepal (Ethnologue).

- Makwanpur District, Bagmati Province
- Chitwan District, Bagmati Province
- Southern Dhading District, Bagmati Province
- Southern Gorkha District, Gandaki Province

Dialects are Western Chepang and Eastern Chepang.

== Phonology ==
=== Consonants ===
Chepang consonants
		Labial	Dental	Alveolar	Palatal	Velar	Glottal
Nasal		m	n̪			ŋ	
Stop	Voiceless	p	t̪	t͡s		k	
Stop	Voiced	b	d̪	d͡z		g	
Fricative				s			h
Approximant				l	j	w	

==== Phonetic Realizations ====
The glottal stop is realized in some contexts, though usually not as a full closure and is instead presented as falling pitch, laryngealization, re-articulation, or by lengthening of the segment before. Some example of possible occurrences are listed below:

- Syllable Initial
  - Full closure [ʔ] at the beginning of words — (ʔ / #__)
  - Re-articulation [<] at the beginning of words — (< / #__)
  - Laryngealization [◌̰] after a vowel and a glottal stop /ʔ/ — (~ / Vʔ__)
  - Lengthening of previous segment [:] after non-glottal consonants — ( : / C[-glottal]__)
- Syllable Final
  - Full closure at the end of words — (ʔ / __#) or when following a vowel and preceding a voiceless consonant — (ʔ / V__C[-voice])
  - Laryngealization following a vowel and preceding a glottal stop — (◌̰ / V__ʔ)
  - And falling pitch in all other contexts The glottal fricative /h/ is realized in many ways and it is much more predictable in the environments that realizations occur. For example:
- In the case of two contiguous segments, if at the beginning of a word the first phoneme becomes voiceless
- If at the end of a word then the second phoneme becomes voiceless
  - the word aal (meaning 'the track or scent of an animal') is phonemically transcribed as [ḁal]
  - and the word samm (meaning 'fuzz of bamboo') is phonemically transcribed as [samm̥]
- Strong aspiration occurs on voiceless obstruents
  - the word phek (meaning 'broom') is phonemically transcribed as [p^{h}ek]
- Breathy voice on the initial part of the syllable in the environment of voiced obstruents
  - the word gaŋ (meaning 'hole') is transcribed as [ɡ̈a̤ŋ]
- /h/ may become /s/ in fast speech when following /j/ and preceding /k/
- /h/ may also become /x/ when contiguous to /j/ and preceding /ʔ/

The voiceless alveolar sibilant /s/ is also realized as /ʃ/ before front vowels.

/w/ when directly next to front vowels is realized as the labio-dental approximant [ʋ]

=== Vowels ===
Chepang vowels
	Front	Central	Back
Close	i		u
Mid	e	ə	o
Open		a	

Research suggests that Chepang may have had a three vowel system at one point in time. Those vowels being /i/ /u/ and /ə/, this is uncommon for a three vowel system as commonly they consist of /a/ /i/ and /u/ as seen in Classical Arabic, Greenlandic and Quechua.

== Syntax ==
Chepang can be described as having a basic word order of Subject Object Verb (SOV) with some alterations due to context. The text below provides an example:

ʔuyhle kəsyaʔ-ʔl manta-kay mayʔ jeʔ-ʔo kheʔ-to
Formerly deer-AG person-DO meat eat-NMZ be
Formerly, deer used to eat people

But it is difficult to define a subject and object for the language in Chepang and may be more accurately described as a verb-final language. The verb does, for the most part, follow its related noun phrases and other constituents. Though it is not uncommon to see the NP follow the verb used as an afterthought.

budhl-kay jan-ʔaka-n budha-ʔl
wife-DO scold-PST-AG husband-AG
He scolded his wife, the husband (did)
