= Timeline of the 2026 Nepal–Tibet floods =

This timeline of the 2026 Nepal–Tibet floods was initially prepared with data from a technical report filed by the Flood Forecasting Division of the Centre of Hydrology and Water Resources Research, Nepal, which was released on 27 August 2026. Please note that given the nature of the disaster, it may never be comprehensive.

All times are Nepal Standard Time (NPT), UTC+05:45, unless stated otherwise. Casualty figures are provisional.

== 26 August ==
8:20 am — A magnitude 2.6 tremor is recorded near the Rasuwagadhi border area between Nepal and Tibet, China.

8:35 am — The final border crossing at Gyirong Port is recorded on Nepal's electronic immigration system.

8:37 am — A putative magnitude 4.4 "earthquake" is recorded (later re–catalogued as a magnitude 5.2 glacial collapse).

8:44 am — A CCTV camera captures the beginning of the destruction of Gyirong Port, as verified by the prefecture city government of Xigazê, Tibet Autonomous Region, China. The amalgamated debris flow had covered 20 km (12 mi) in approximately seven minutes, a speed of around 180 km/h (110 mph), in part due to the drop in elevation of nearly 3,000 m (9,800 ft).

8:50 am — The water-level monitoring station in Syabrubesi, Rasuwa district, northern Nepal, ceases transmission. Its last reading, at 8:40, had been 1.62 m (5 ft 4 in) (normal).

9:00–9:05 am — The Flood Forecasting Division learns, from the District Administration Office in Rasuwa and staff at the Betrabati hydrological station, that a major flood had entered the Bhotekoshi River from Tibet. The surge enters the Trishuli River, after which it spreads more gradually.

9:15–9:16 am — SMS emergency alerts are sent to 679,295 residents in riverbank areas of the districts of Rasuwa, Nuwakot, Dhading and Chitwan. Authorities also begin evacuating and warning people along the Trishuli corridor up to Muglin.

9:20 am — The monitoring station at Betrawati ceases to transmit. Its last recorded river level was 3.55 m (11.6 ft) (warning level 4.1 m (13 ft), danger level 5 m (16 ft)).

10:28 am — It is forecast that the flood shall reach the Dhading-Galchhi area and pass Muglin within a few hours. The areas of the Prithvi Highway, the Muglin-Narayanghat road, and settlements along the Trishuli River are alerted.

11:26 am — The Phurke (Malekhu) monitoring station records that the Trishuli River has risen above the danger mark.

11:43 am — The Phurke river bridge and other structures, along with the Malekhu monitoring station, are swept away by the flood.

11:50 am — The Malekhu area suffers impact.

1:00 pm — Authorities confirm the flood has passed Muglin, and riverine residents of the Trishuli as far as Devghat are alerted.

1:30 pm — The water level at Devghat reaches 4.76 m (15.6 ft). The main surge is expected to arrive at roughly 3:30 pm, with a potential rise to 8 m (26 ft) calculated.

1:35 pm — Authorities again warn that the lake formed by the river blockage in China had not fully drained and that the risk remained.

2:14 pm — The Kalikhola monitoring station reaches the danger level. Its peak level is 12.3 m (40 ft).

3:20 pm — The flood reaches the Narayani River - Devghat area, where the level is still rising.

4:00 pm — The water level at Devghat peaks at 6.57 m (21.6 ft) and begins to fall.

6:13 pm (14:28 UTC+2) — The International Charter Space and Major Disasters is activated at the request of the Department of Hydrology and Meteorology (DHM), Ministry of Energy, Water Resources and Irrigation in Nepal; the United Nations Institute for Training and Research (UNITAR) is designated the managing agency.

6:30 pm — The water level at Devghat falls back to approximately 4 m (13 ft). The flood is estimated to have comprised an additional volume of about 20 million m^{3} of water passing through Devghat. Approximately 10 hours have passed since the seismic signal. The flood destroyed four automatic hydrological monitoring stations operated by the Centre for Hydrology and Water Resources Research (at Syabrubesi, Rasuwa–Bhotekoshi, Betrawati and Malekhu/Phurke).

Response — Prime Minister Balendra Shah said the Nepali Army, Armed Police Force and Nepal Police had been deployed, with additional personnel sent from other districts; 14 helicopters were mobilised for search and rescue (four operated by the army, the rest by private companies), two army helicopters carrying medical teams were dispatched to the affected areas, and the National Disaster Risk Reduction and Management Authority (NDRRMA) was activated. The Cabinet ordered free medical treatment for the injured and financial assistance for bereaved families. The Department of Roads confirmed that the entire 42-kilometre (26 mi) road linking Betrawati to the Rasuwagadhi border crossing had been destroyed at multiple points, and a further 16-kilometre (9.9 mi) stretch toward the border was also swept away. The Nepal Electricity Authority reported damage to up to 14 hydropower projects with a combined capacity of roughly 748 MW, together with a 220 kV substation, taking 430 MW (more than 12% of national capacity) off the grid. Nine commercial bank branches were swept away, with 26 staff initially unaccounted for, and the Rasuwa customs office in Timure lost contact with 15 employees. The IFRC released nearly CHF 1 million from its Disaster Response Emergency Fund to the Nepal Red Cross Society, which deployed more than 200 staff and volunteers distributing water, tarpaulins, blankets, sleeping mats, first-aid kits and body bags. Late on 26 August, the Office of the Prime Minister and Council of Ministers issued its public appeal for donations.

== 27 August ==
Morning — The death toll is confirmed at 165, with 73 injured, up from roughly 160 reported the previous evening and superseding an early figure of 95 from the Prime Minister's Office. As of a Nepal Police bulletin around 8:15 am, 826 people are listed as missing in Nepal: 579 travellers (466 foreign nationals and 113 Nepalis), 85 security personnel (44 Nepali Army, 28 Nepal Police and 13 Armed Police Force), 161 residents of Rasuwa and one of Nuwakot. The missing foreign travellers include at least 133 Indian pilgrims, along with citizens of Malaysia, the United States, Australia, the United Kingdom and Canada, many of whom were on the Kailash Mansarovar pilgrimage route through Tibet. On the Chinese side, state media reported three confirmed deaths and 558 missing around the Gyirong Port trade hub, bringing the combined missing total past 1,300 (the two countries' counts of foreign nationals may overlap).

Response — The IFRC launches a 24-month Emergency Appeal for CHF 25 million to support the Nepal Red Cross response across shelter, cash assistance, health, household relief items, water, sanitation and hygiene, mental health and psychosocial support, and restoring family links. The United Nations Children's Fund (UNICEF) says at least 17,000 children are in urgent need of humanitarian assistance, with 18 schools destroyed and 20 damaged. Nepal's Ministry of Finance says roughly रू 20 billion already allocated in the current fiscal-year budget can be redirected immediately for rescue and relief, and adopts a "one-door policy" for cash and in-kind donations (see Donations and relief appeals). Relief agencies including Oxfam, Save the Children (delivering cooking kits, mosquito nets and blankets to about 1,000 households), World Vision Nepal (Category I national response declaration and preparing a 90-day humanitarian response), Direct Relief, All Hands and Hearts, Catholic Relief Services, Humanity & Inclusion, and World Central Kitchen begin mobilizing. (Cf. Donations and relief appeals).

== 28 August ==
Four severely decomposed bodies are recovered from a river in Uttar Pradesh's Maharajganj district in India, and India later reports a total of seven bodies recovered from rivers flowing from Nepal.

Nepal's death toll rises to 579, and the number of missing people more than doubles to just under 2,000 (1,924, including more than 500 foreigners from more than 30 countries) after 933 hydropower workers are added to the missing list. Around 14,829 security personnel have been mobilised for search and rescue. The International Red Cross estimates that at least 93,000 people have been affected and are "in great need".

Barrier-lake breach scare — Rasuwa Chief District Officer Narendra Pariyar says the Nepali Army has informed him that a lake formed upstream near the Chhochen Khola / Purepu Tsangpo confluence has breached or begun overflowing, prompting a temporary halt of about three hours to rescue operations. Nepali police urge rescuers to "immediately move to a safe location" after a further report of a dam bursting on the Tibetan side. Officials later say the water level rose only about 0.6 metres (2.0 ft) and the risk has eased, and rescue work resumes; Chinese authorities say the lake level fell by about 10 metres (33 ft) and that the situation is manageable after deploying an eight-member engineering team. On the same day the International Red Cross says relief trucks carrying supplies have been blocked by the lake and voices concern about a possible "secondary flood".

International response — Nepal's Foreign Ministry says it does not at present require foreign search-and-rescue teams, even as India, China, the United States, Britain, Japan, South Korea, Sri Lanka and Bangladesh offer such assistance. Seoul pledges US$1 million in humanitarian aid through international organizations. The US State Department is tracking about 90 Americans unaccounted for. The World Bank's country director tells Nepal's finance ministry that up to Rs25 billion could potentially be mobilised as emergency assistance, and China agrees to provide immediate cash assistance through its ambassador to Nepal Zhang Maoming. The World Health Organization warns of an elevated risk of disease—including diarrhoea and respiratory illness—following population displacement and disruption to water and sanitation services.

== 29 August ==
The NDRRMA reports a death toll of 616–626, with bodies recovered from eight districts: 233 from Chitwan, 158 from Nawalparasi East, 51 from Nuwakot, 48 from Gorkha, 47 from Nawalparasi West, 45 from Dhading, 31 from Tanahu and 13 from Rasuwa. The number of missing in Nepal stands at 1,924, including 517 foreigners, while Tibet reports 7 dead and 554 missing, having evacuated 555 stranded tourists and 499 Chinese residents. Roughly 2,500 people have been evacuated by rescue teams. Search efforts continue at the Trishuli 3A hydropower project, where about 350 workers and residents have been brought to safety but more than 100 remain trapped in a tunnel, with the army dispatching helicopters to locate entry points.

== 30 August ==
In Chitwan district in westernmost Nepal about 100 miles (160 km) from the worst-hit region more than 250 bodies have washed up, so badly mangled that only nine could be readily identified. In Bharatpur, Nepal, mass burials begin.

== 1 September ==
Across Nepal some 4,000 people remain missing and nearly 12,000 have been rescued; the death toll is 1,003, and as many as 321 bodies are recovered in various districts and cities, as per the National Disaster Risk Reduction and Management Authority (NDRRMA).
