= Pasang Lhamu Highway =

National highway in Nepal

Pasang Lhamu Highway पासाङ ल्हामु राजमार्ग
- राष्ट्रिय राजमार्ग १८
- National Highway 18
- NH18 shown in red
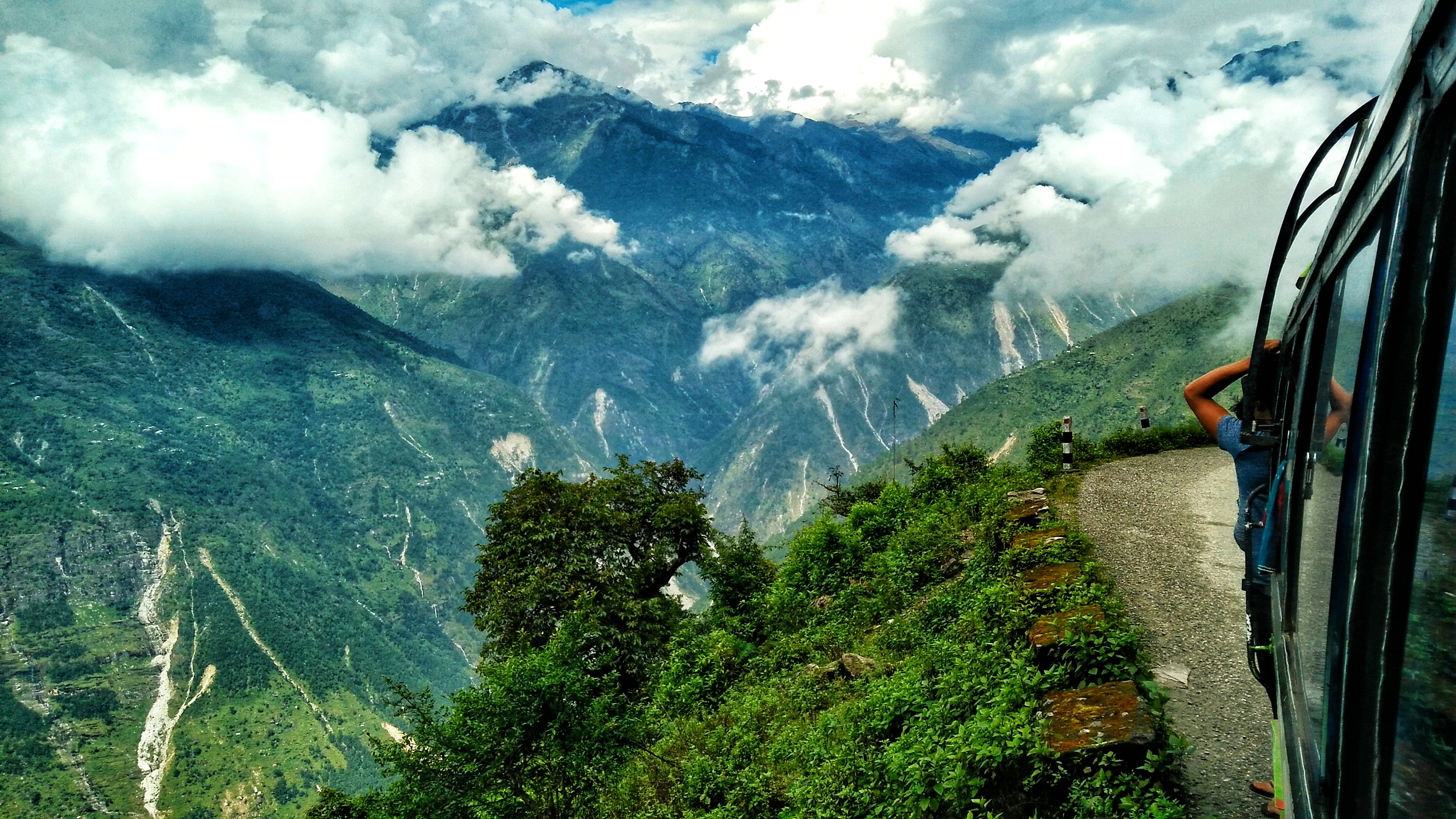
- Pasang Lhamu Highway near Dhunche

Route information
- Maintained by MoPIT (Department of Roads)
- History: Formerly designated F021

Major junctions
- North end: Syaphrubesi
- Bidur; Betrawati
- South end: Balaju Bypass, Kathmandu

Location
- Country: Nepal
- Provinces: Bagmati Province
- Districts: Kathmandu District, Nuwakot District, Rasuwa District

Highway system
- Roads in Nepal
← NH17	→ NH19

The Pasang Lhamu Highway (National Highway 18, NH18; Nepali: पासाङ ल्हामु राजमार्ग) is a national highway in Bagmati Province, Nepal. It is named after Pasang Lhamu Sherpa, the first Nepali woman to summit Mount Everest. It runs from Balaju in Kathmandu through Nuwakot District and the district headquarters of Dhunche to Syaphrubesi in Rasuwa District. The Department of Roads describes NH18 as the Balaju–Trishuli–Dhunche–Syaphrubesi route.

Between Betrawati and Syaphrubesi, NH18 is the older hill route through Kalikasthan and Dhunche. The Trishuli Corridor (NH42) provides a shorter alternative through the Trishuli valley via Mailung. Although the numbered NH18 route ends at Syaphrubesi, news reports also sometimes use the name Pasang Lhamu Highway for the wider Kathmandu–Rasuwagadhi road connection, including the onward road to the border with China.

== Route ==
NH18 begins at Balaju Bypass and runs northwest through Nagarjun to Thulo Khola. In Nuwakot District, it continues through Kakani and Tadi Khola to Beltar, near Bidur and Trishuli Bazaar.

Between Beltar and Betrawati, the through road is numbered NH42. It passes through Battar and Gerkhutar before crossing into Rasuwa District at Betrawati. NH18 resumes at Betrawati, climbs through Kalikasthan and the Ramche area to Dhunche, and then descends to its northern terminus at Syaphrubesi.

== Relationship with the Trishuli Corridor ==
NH18 and NH42 take different routes between Betrawati and Syaphrubesi. NH18 crosses the hills through Kalikasthan and Dhunche, whereas NH42 follows the Trishuli valley through Mailung. The Nepal Army opened the 17-kilometre (11 mi) Mailung–Syaphrubesi track in 2018. Its completion shortened the Betrawati–Syaphrubesi journey by approximately 24 kilometres (15 mi) compared with the existing route through Dhunche.

The two highways meet again at Syaphrubesi. From there, NH42 continues north alongside the Bhote Koshi through Timure to Rasuwagadhi, on the Nepali side of the China–Nepal border, opposite Gyirong (Kerung) in the Tibet Autonomous Region of China.

== Border trade and transport ==
The Kathmandu–Syaphrubesi–Rasuwagadhi road system is an important transport connection between Nepal and China. Its importance increased after the 2015 Nepal earthquake severely damaged the Araniko Highway, the other principal road corridor to the Chinese border. The road carries freight between Kathmandu and the Rasuwagadhi–Gyirong crossing, and the Galchhi–Rasuwagadhi corridor has been linked to implementation of the 2016 Nepal–China Transit Transport Agreement.

Because NH18 formally ends at Syaphrubesi, access from the highway to Rasuwagadhi depends on the northern section of NH42. Secondary sources nevertheless frequently refer to the combined Kathmandu–Rasuwagadhi connection as the Pasang Lhamu Highway.

== Road conditions and hazards ==
The road crosses steep and geologically unstable terrain. Sections between Betrawati, Dhunche and Syaphrubesi are narrow, have sharp bends and are vulnerable to landslides during the monsoon. Reporting in 2022 described extensive potholes and recurrent landslides, while freight operators have reported delays caused by mud, landslide debris and vehicles becoming stuck on single-lane sections. These conditions particularly affect heavily loaded vehicles carrying goods to and from the Chinese border.

=== 2026 floods ===
On 26 August 2026, the 2026 Nepal floods caused extensive destruction in the Bhote Koshi and Trishuli valleys. Floodwaters severely damaged Syaphrubesi, Timure and Rasuwagadhi and washed away sections of the road connecting Betrawati with the Chinese border. The principal road destruction occurred along the valley connection served by NH42, including the road north of NH18's terminus at Syaphrubesi.

== History ==
Before the introduction of the present national-highway numbering, the Department of Roads classified the wider Kathmandu–Trishuli–Dhunche–Rasuwagadhi corridor as feeder road F021. Under the present classification, NH18 terminates at Syaphrubesi, while NH42 continues to Rasuwagadhi.
