= Gyirong Port =

Border crossing between China and Nepal

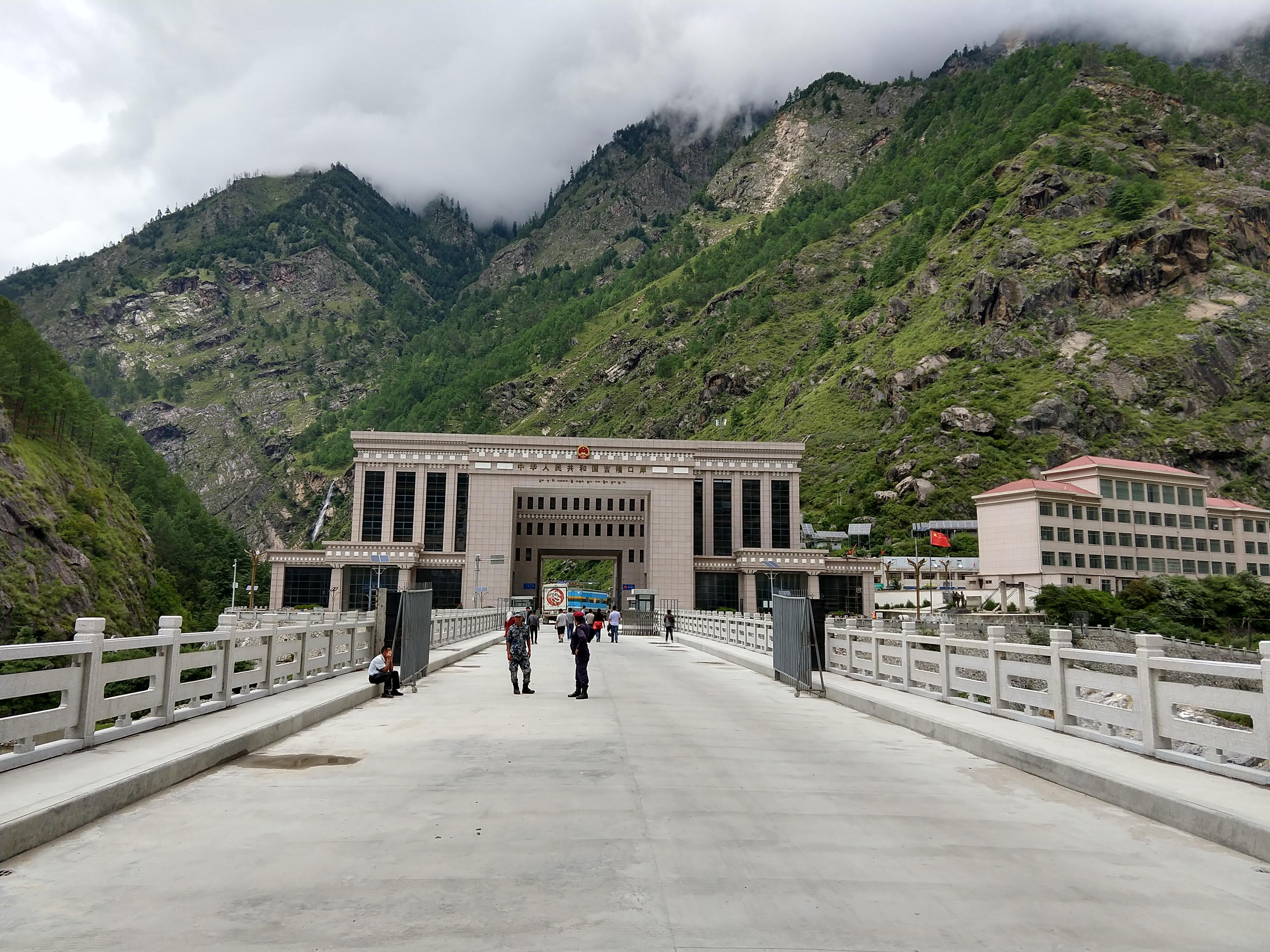
- Gyirong Port in August 2019, viewed from the Nepali side of the Risur Bridge

Location
- Country: China
- Location: Risur, Gyirong County, Tibet Autonomous Region
- Coordinates: 28°16′47″N 85°22′40″E

Details
- Opened: 1961 (Customs office)
- Closed: 26 August 2026 (destroyed in 2026 Nepal floods)

Statistics
- Crossing type: Land port and border crossing
- Routes: G216 / National Highway 42
- Nepali port: Rasuwagadhi (Rasuwa Fort)

Gyirong Port (Chinese: 吉隆口岸; pinyin: Jílóng kǒu'àn; Tibetan: སྐྱིད་གྲོང་འགག་སྒོ་།) (Note: Also rendered as Kyirong Port. Alternatively known as Jilong Port (from the Chinese name), or Kerung Port (from the Nepali name).) was a Chinese land port and border crossing on the China–Nepal border. The port complex stood at the confluence of the Trishuli River with the Lhende Khola, near Risur (Chinese: 热索; pinyin: Rèsuǒ; Tibetan: རི་ཟུར་།), in Gyirong County in the Tibet Autonomous Region, opposite Rasuwagadhi (रसुवागढी, Rasuvāgaḍhī) in Nepal. The two sides were connected by the Nepal–China Friendship Bridge, also known as the Miteri Bridge (from मितेरि, the Nepali word for "friendship") or Risur Bridge (from its location in Risur, Gyirong County).

The Gyirong valley had long served as a trade and travel route between Nepal and Tibet. After modernization, the port became important for cross-border trade and tourism. Its road connection joined China National Highway 216 with Nepal's National Highway 42. The complex was damaged in the 2025 Nepal floods and was ultimately destroyed during the 2026 Nepal floods.

== Location and transport ==
Road traffic crossed the border over the 110-metre (360 ft) Nepal–China Friendship Bridge, which opened in June 2019 after its predecessor was damaged in the 2015 Nepal earthquake. The 2019 bridge was swept away by floods in July 2025. A temporary Bailey bridge completed in December allowed the border to reopen before being destroyed by the 2026 floods.

On the Chinese side, China National Highway 216 (G216) terminated at Gyirong Port and connected it northward with Gyirong Town and the Tibetan road network. In 2017, the Tibet Autonomous Region government described the 94.38-kilometre (58.65 mi) G216 approach between Dzongka, the county seat, and Risur Bridge as having 23 geological-hazard sites, an average of approximately one every four kilometres (2.5 mi).

On the Nepali side, the road continued south from Rasuwagadhi as the Trishuli Corridor (NH42), through Syaphrubesi, Mailung, Trishuli and Galchhi. NH42 is designated as a 197-kilometre (122 mi) national highway between Rasuwagadhi and Thori on the Nepal–India border. Kathmandu-bound traffic can leave NH42 at Galchhi for NH17, while the Pasang Lhamu Highway (NH18) provides the older route from Syaphrubesi through Dhunche and Trishuli to Kathmandu. The opening of the Mailung–Syaphrubesi section in 2018 shortened the Galchhi–Rasuwagadhi journey by approximately 25 kilometres (16 mi) compared with the older route through Dhunche.

== History ==
=== Background ===
The Gyirong valley has been one of the most important transportation routes between Nepal and Tibet for over a millennium. In the 7th century, Bhrikuti of Nepal entered Tibet via Gyirong to become a consort of Songtsen Gampo, the first emperor of Tibet. The Tang diplomat Wang Xuance travelled via Gyirong on his way to India, leaving one of the oldest stone inscriptions in Tibet near Dzongka. Padmasambhava, who according to tradition established Vajrayana Buddhism in Tibet in the 8th century, crossed the Himalayas through the same route. The Qing army under Fukang'an counterattacked through the Gyirong valley in 1792 during the Sino-Nepalese War. A battle was fought over the river crossing at the present-day location of Gyirong Port.

A customs office was established in Gyirong in 1961. From 1978, residents of the border area were permitted to cross the border for local trade. Because of limited transport and energy infrastructure, cross-border traffic remained largely confined to small-scale local trade for the following two decades.

=== Development ===
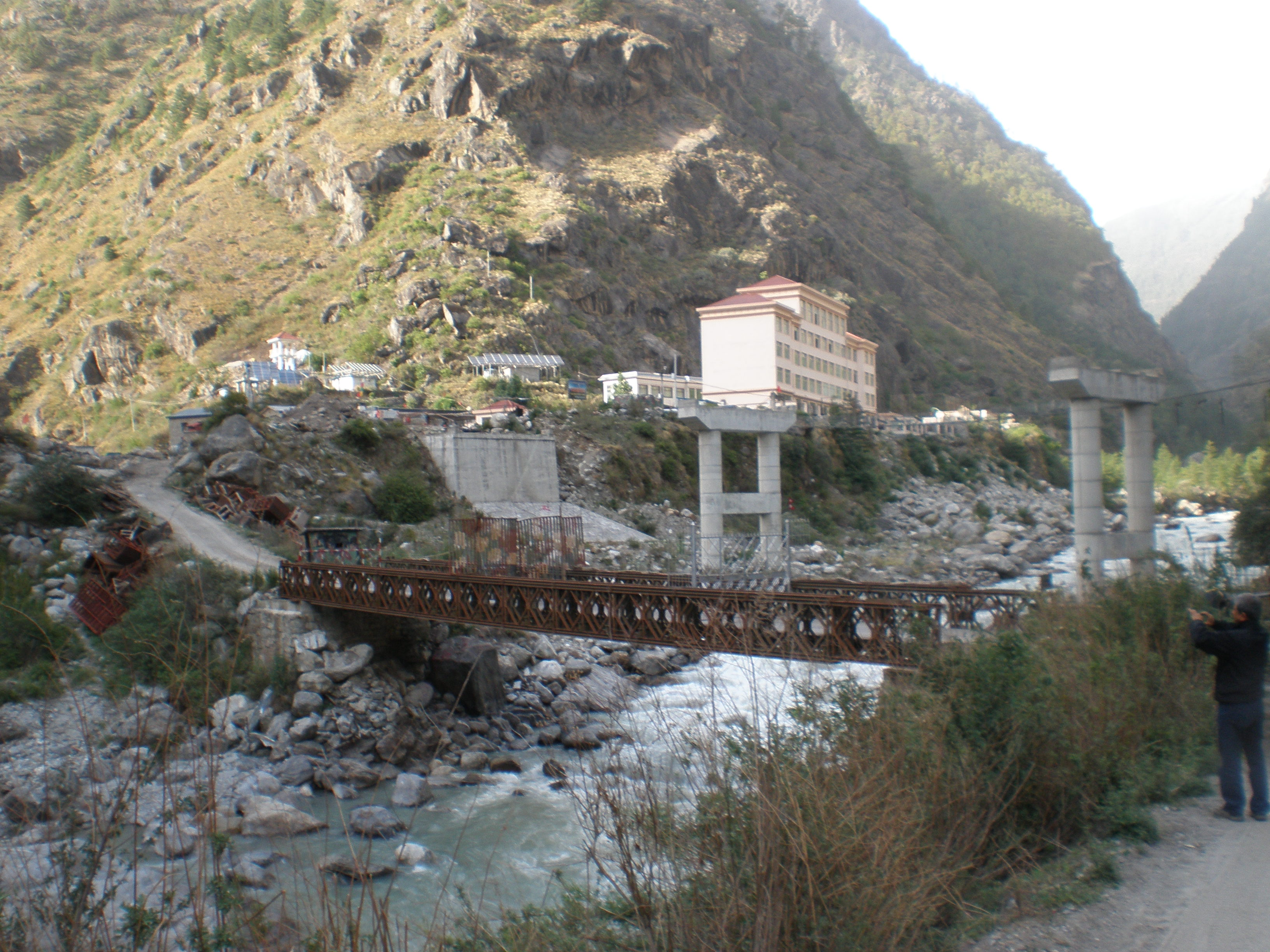
Under construction in 2013

Development of Gyirong Port began in the early 1990s, with infrastructure intended to facilitate trade between China and Nepal. Around 2009, the think-tank Chinese Academy of International Trade and Economic Cooperation under the Ministry of Commerce proposed to designate a 44.5 km^{2} (17.2 mi^{2}) cross-border economic cooperation zone in the area. In 2011, an environmental study was finished, in which it was found that 11.8 km^{2} (4.6 mi^{2}) of the planning area had suitable geological conditions.

Its expansion into a modern logistics hub accelerated after the 2015 Nepal earthquake severely damaged the neighbouring Zhangmu–Kodari crossing, which had been the principal facility for bilateral overland trade. The Chinese government subsequently prioritized Gyirong as an alternative trade corridor and invested in its infrastructure.

By 2018, the road between Gyirong Town and the border had been upgraded and a border-trade market had been built. In that year, Gyirong Port handled 75,332 tonnes of goods, with a total trade value of CN¥1.39 billion. In 2020, more than 60 per cent of trade between China and Nepal passed through Gyirong. In 2024, the trade volume reached CN¥4.25 billion, accounting for almost 30 per cent of China–Nepal trade.

Gyirong Port was part of China's Belt and Road Initiative as a node in the China–Nepal Economic Corridor. The Chinese government implemented policies intended to attract investment and increase trade, including tax incentives for businesses operating through the port and streamlined approval processes for cross-border projects.

=== 2025 flood damage ===
Gyirong Port closed after the 2025 Rasuwagadhi flood on 8 July destroyed the "Friendship Bridge" across the border and left 17 people missing in the surrounding area. Customs clearance resumed over a temporary Bailey bridge in January 2026.

=== 2026 flood destruction ===
Floodwater and debris engulfing the port complex during the 2026 Nepal floods. The view is downstream along the Trishuli River, with the flood coming down from the Lhende Khola from the left.

On 26 August 2026, floodwater and debris engulfed the port complex during the 2026 Nepal floods. Roads and communication links serving the port were disrupted.

Radar imagery acquired by the PowerChina-1 satellite on 27 August showed that the flood had widened the river channel at Gyirong Port. By 28 August, rescuers who reached the area reported that the port complex and several nearby bridges had been destroyed. A Chinese flag was planted on the former site of the checkpoint building by 3 September, signifying that a rescue corridor has been opened to the site.

As of September 6, 2026, Chinese authorities reported 43 people dead and 519 missing on the Chinese side of the border, including 261 foreign nationals.

== See also ==
- Everest road
