= 2026 Nepal–Tibet floods =

Flash flood disaster in Nepal and China

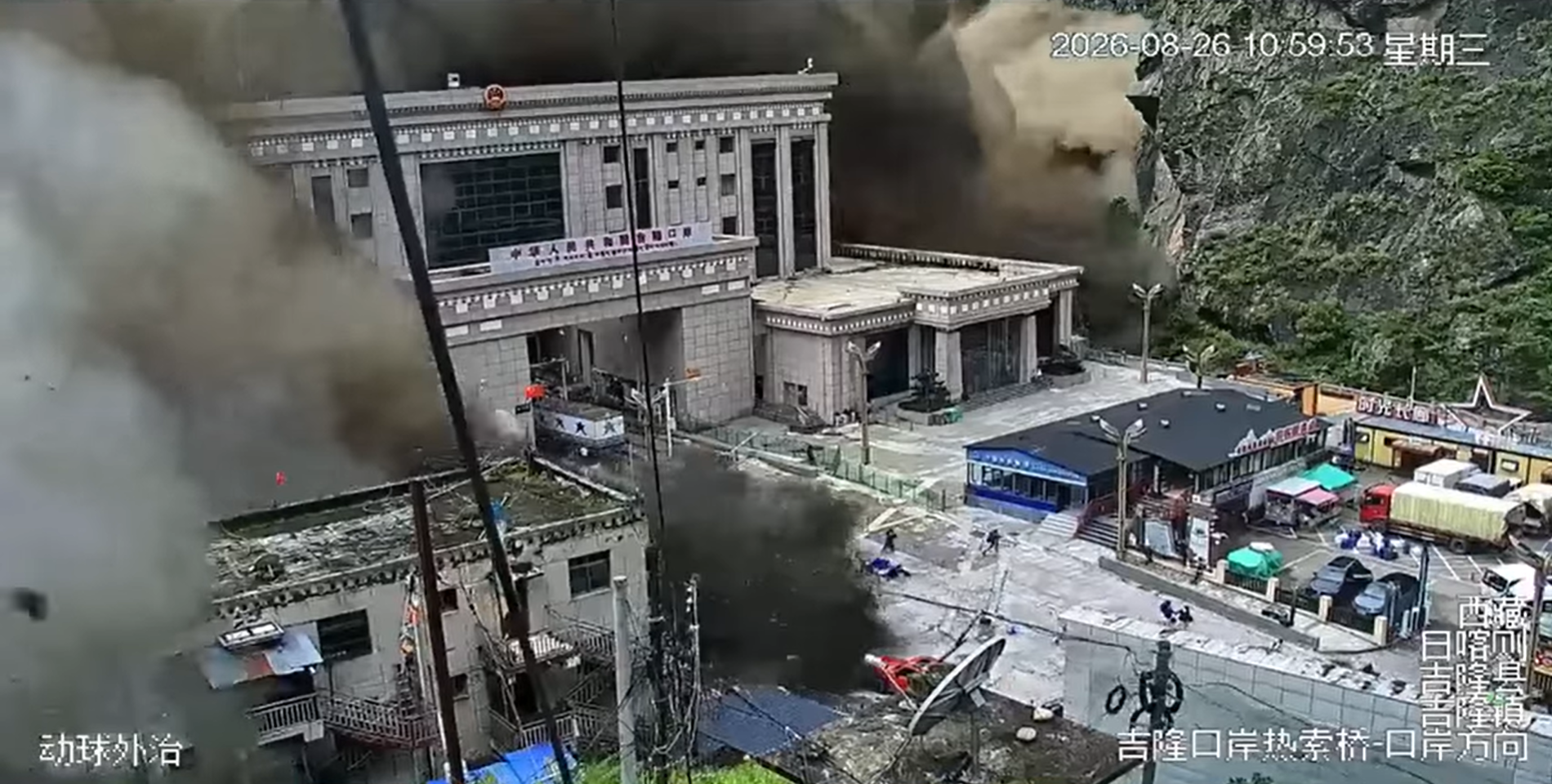
- Flood hitting the Gyirong Port crossing on the China–Nepal border seven minutes after a M_{s} 5.2 tremor
- Extent of debris flow and flooding
- Date: 26 August 2026
- Location: Rasuwa & Nuwakot districts; Bagmati Province; Nepal; Gyirong County; Tibet Autonomous Region; People's Republic of China; 28.3°N 85.5°E
- Type: Flash flood, debris flow
- Cause: Rock-ice avalanche
- Deaths: 1,498+ (Note: 1,455 in Nepal, 43 in China)
- Injuries: 9,287+
- Missing: 5,804+ (Note: 5,285 in Nepal, 519 in China)
- Property damage: Nepal: रू 277.79 billion+ (US$1.8 billion+); China: CN¥ 450 million+ (US$67.08 million+)

On the morning of 26 August 2026, a series of flash floods and debris flows destroyed the Gyirong Port on the China–Nepal border and struck dozens of settlements along a 72 km (45 mi) stretch of the Trishuli River (Note: The Trishuli River's upper section in Nepal is also known as the Bhotekoshi River; a larger river 65 kilometres (40 mi) to the east, also named Bhotekoshi, was unaffected.) in Nepal. These events are also known as the 2026 Nepal-China floods, Bhotekoshi flood, or Rasuwa flood.

At least 1,455 deaths and 5,285 missing persons in Nepal, and 43 deaths and 519 missing in the Tibet Autonomous Region of China were reported. The flood carried the bodies of some victims 250 km (160 mi) away into neighbouring India.

The precipitating geological event, initially reported as a glacier collapse in the Langtang region of the Himalayas, caused a chain reaction whose tremors were detected by seismometers worldwide, with magnitudes reaching M_{s} 5.2. According to experts at the National Society for Earthquake Technology–Nepal (NSET), the University of Reading and Newcastle University, the flood was triggered by a large rock-ice avalanche originating from the Lirung massif, involving glacier ice and rock, which transformed into a highly mobile, long-runout debris flow and generated destructive downstream flooding.

== Background ==
=== Geography and history ===
The Trishuli River is joined by the Lhende Khola (also known as Lende River or Donglin Tsangpo in Lhasa Tibetan), which originates in Gyirong County, Tibet Autonomous Region before entering Nepal. It then flows past Dhunche, downstream from which it forms part of the Trishuli River system.

The flash floods and mudslides occurred around the China–Nepal border crossing at Gyirong Port, a strategic border crossing connecting Nepal's Rasuwa District and Gyirong County, located at the confluence of the Trishuli and Lhende Khola rivers. The crossing saw large amounts of daily traffic related to both commerce and tourism, especially the pilgrimage tour to Mount Kailash, a holy site in Bon, Buddhism, Hinduism and Jainism. The Gyirong crossing accounted for 30% of all Nepal-China trade before the disaster, and more than 100,000 people had used the crossing in the first half of 2026 according to Chinese media.

Since 1900, dozens of floods have occurred near the border between Nepal and China. Langtang Lirung, opposite the site of the 2026 landslide, experienced a major glacier collapse and debris avalanche triggered by the April and May 2015 Nepal earthquakes. The landslide in the Langtang valley destroyed and buried several villages, killing over 350 people. A July 2025 flood caused by a glacial lake outburst washed away the bridge at the border crossing.

Analysis of satellite imagery found that from 8 January 2026 to 18 August 2026, the glacier north of Langtang Lirung moved around 10 millimetres per month, but the rate accelerated in the weeks prior to the glacier's collapse.

==== Gallery ====
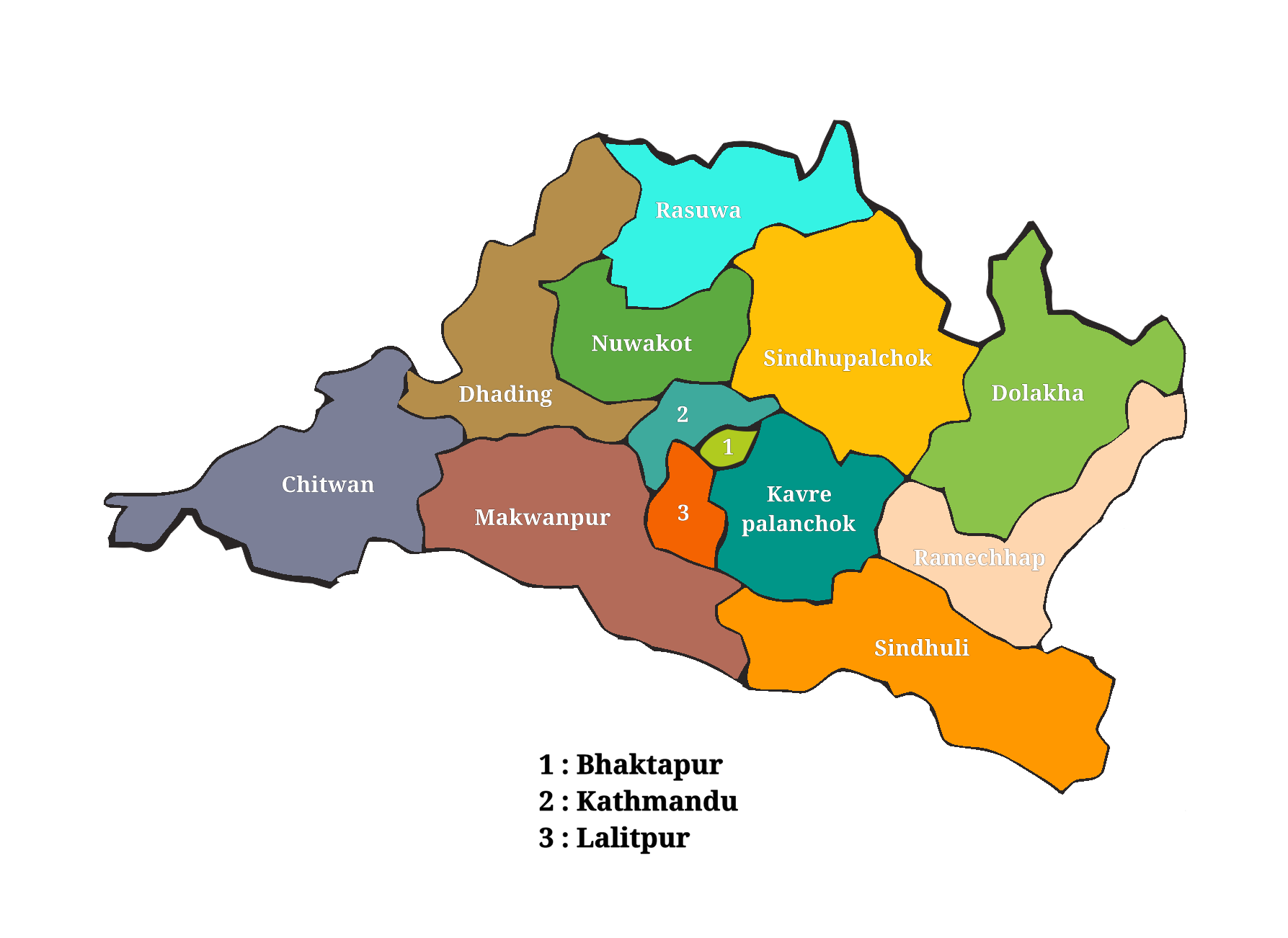
Districts in Bagmati Province, Nepal

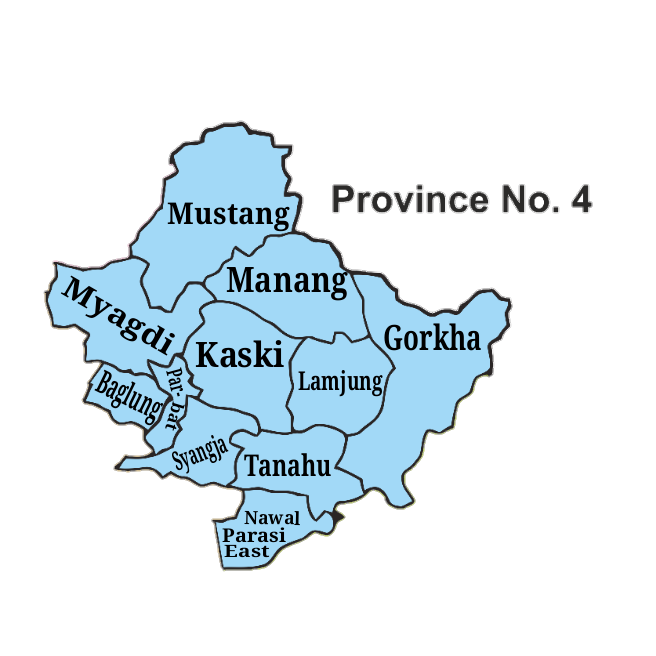
Districts in Gandaki Province, Nepal

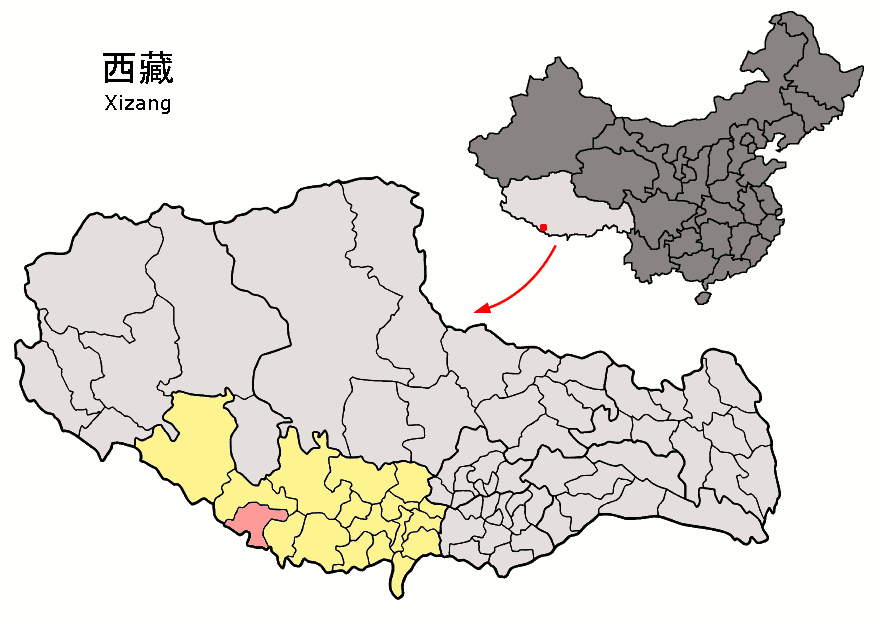
- Gyirong County (pink)
- Shigatse (yellow)
- Tibet (light grey)
- China (dark grey)

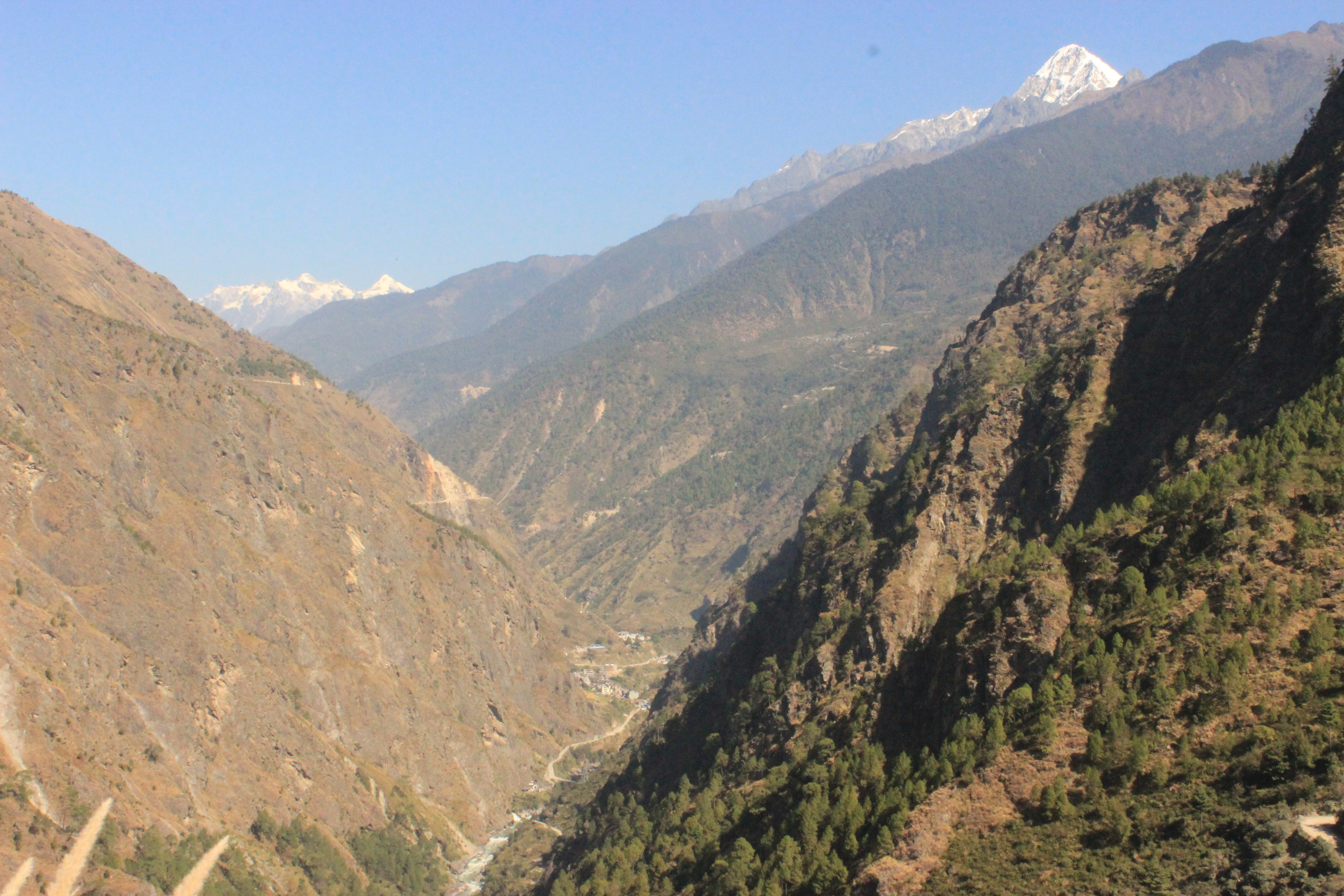
Trishuli Valley in Rasuwa District

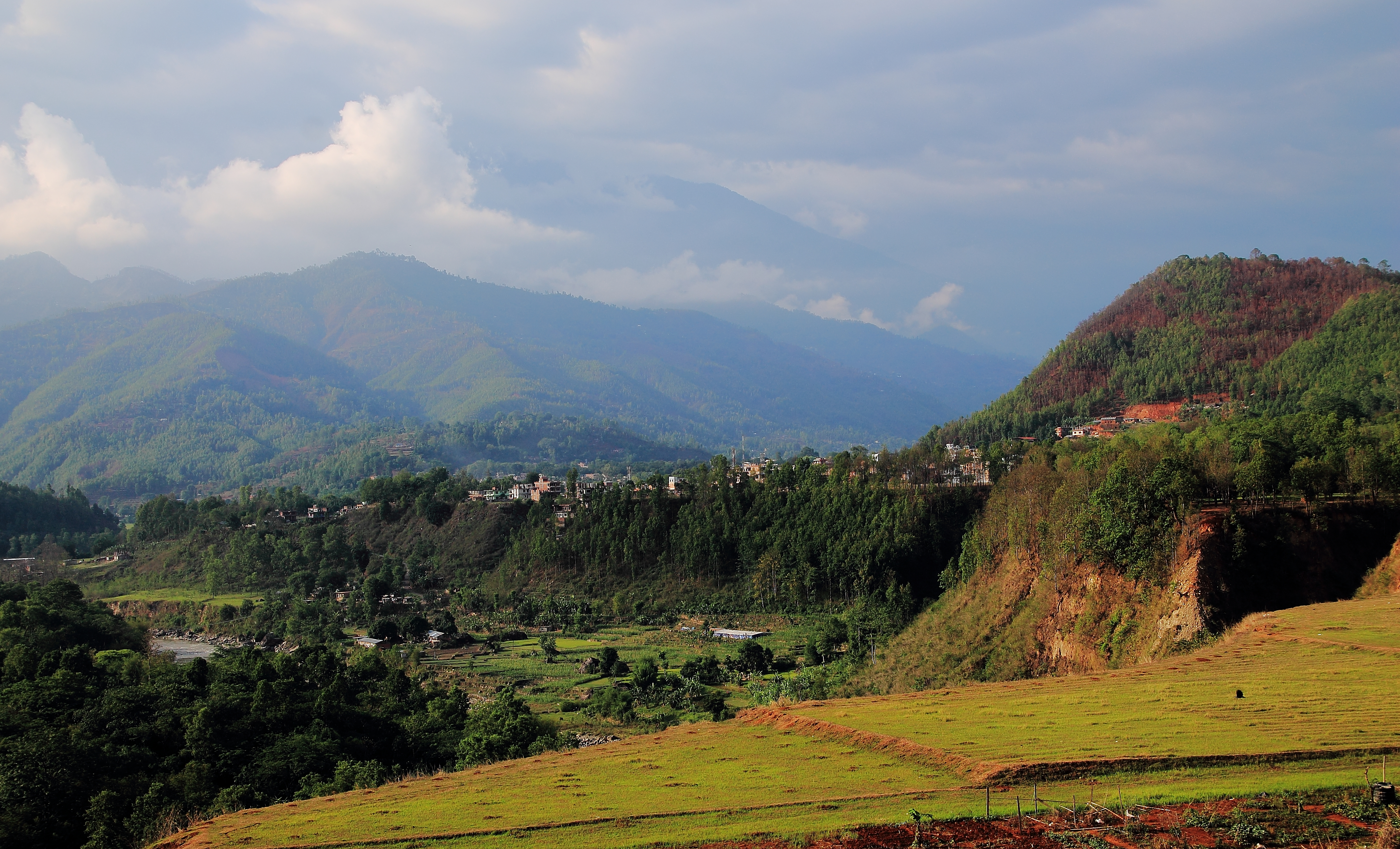
Nuwakot District

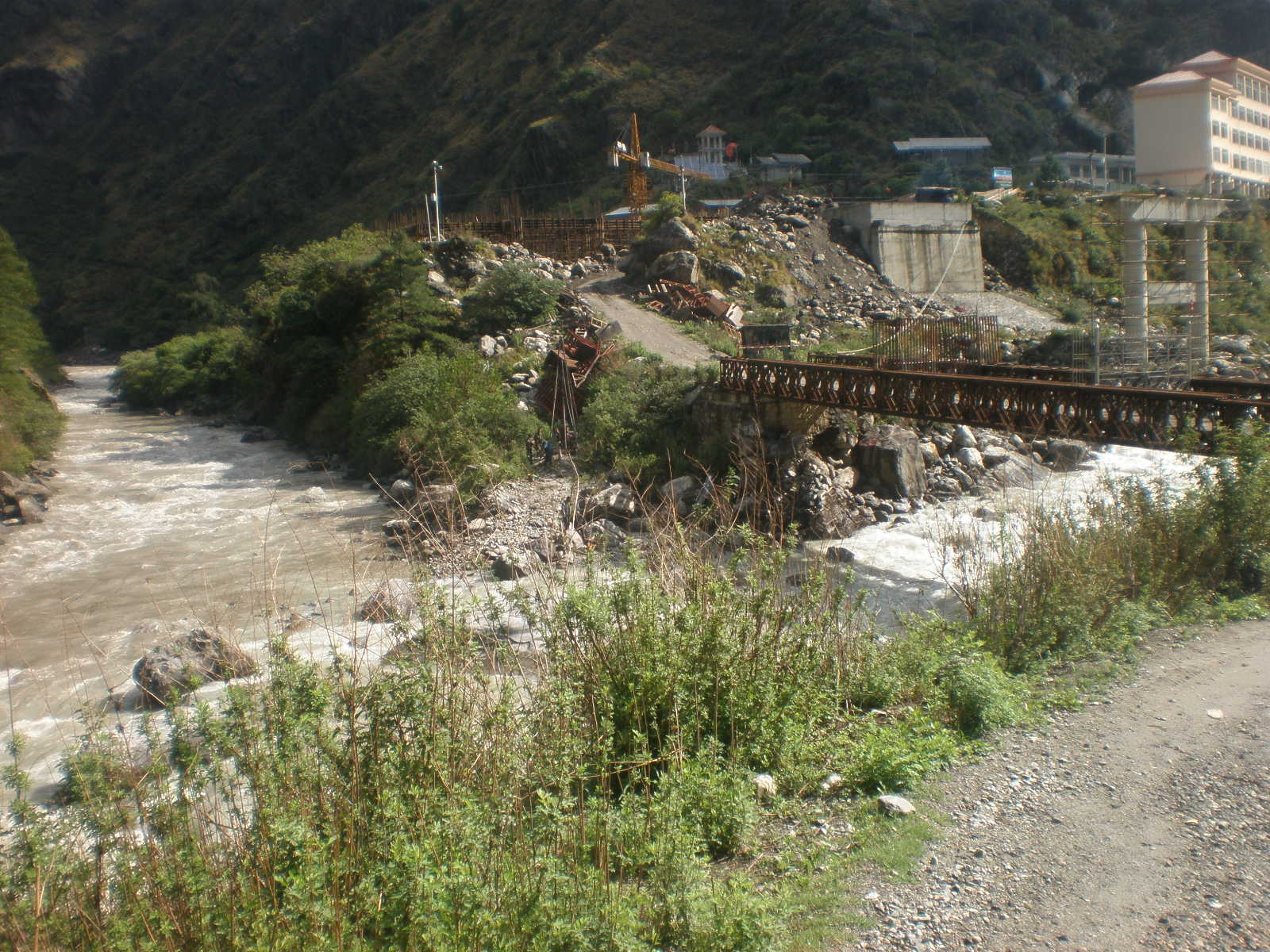
Confluence of Trishuli River (left) and the Lhende Khola (right) in 2013

=== Climate change ===
Climate change contributes to the melting of permafrost, which in turn increases the likelihood of glacier collapses. Alton C. Byers, a senior research associate at the Institute of Arctic and Alpine Research, University of Colorado Boulder, said, "Permafrost has been the cryospheric glue that's held the rock and the ice and the glaciers together for millennia, and now we're getting increasing evidence that it's being weakened by warming trends."

Researchers quoted by the BBC, CNN, and NPR said climate change probably increased the likelihood of the event. Nepal foreign minister Shisir Khanal called for increased global response to climate change and stated that Nepal was bearing a disproportionate share of its consequences.

=== Early warning systems ===
Chinese and Nepali scientists have maintained a flash flood early warning system for years, which the South China Morning Post credited with consistently preventing casualties. The system did not detect the August 2026 flood in time as the water level monitors were configured for detecting monsoon and perennial floods. Upstream monitoring stations in Nepal were swept away by the flooding before alerts could be sent. A senior fellow at the Stimson Center remarked that the affected region was a monitoring "blind spot" and that geologists paid little attention to it.

After the 2025 floods, Chinese authorities in Gyirong County took a number of measures in preparation for a new glacial lake outburst flood. The local government updated emergency plans, set up a sentry system monitoring water level changes, constructed flood prevention structures such as a new flood wall, dikes and channels, trained local officials in "glacial lake outburst defense", and simulated an emergency evacuation of villagers. The August 2026 flood, which was caused by a different event than the system was built to anticipate, overwhelmed these defenses within minutes.

The incident began at around 08:37 NPT. At 09:00, the Nepalese Department of Hydrology and Meteorology was informed of the flood by the District Administrative Officer in Rasuwa, by which time several communications towers had been destroyed and door-to-door warnings were being sent. The first text alerts were sent out by 09:15, with 679,295 warning text messages sent within one minute. Authorities issued flood warnings for communities along rivers in the Nepali districts of Rasuwa, Nuwakot, Dhading, Gorkha, and Chitwan.

== Cause ==
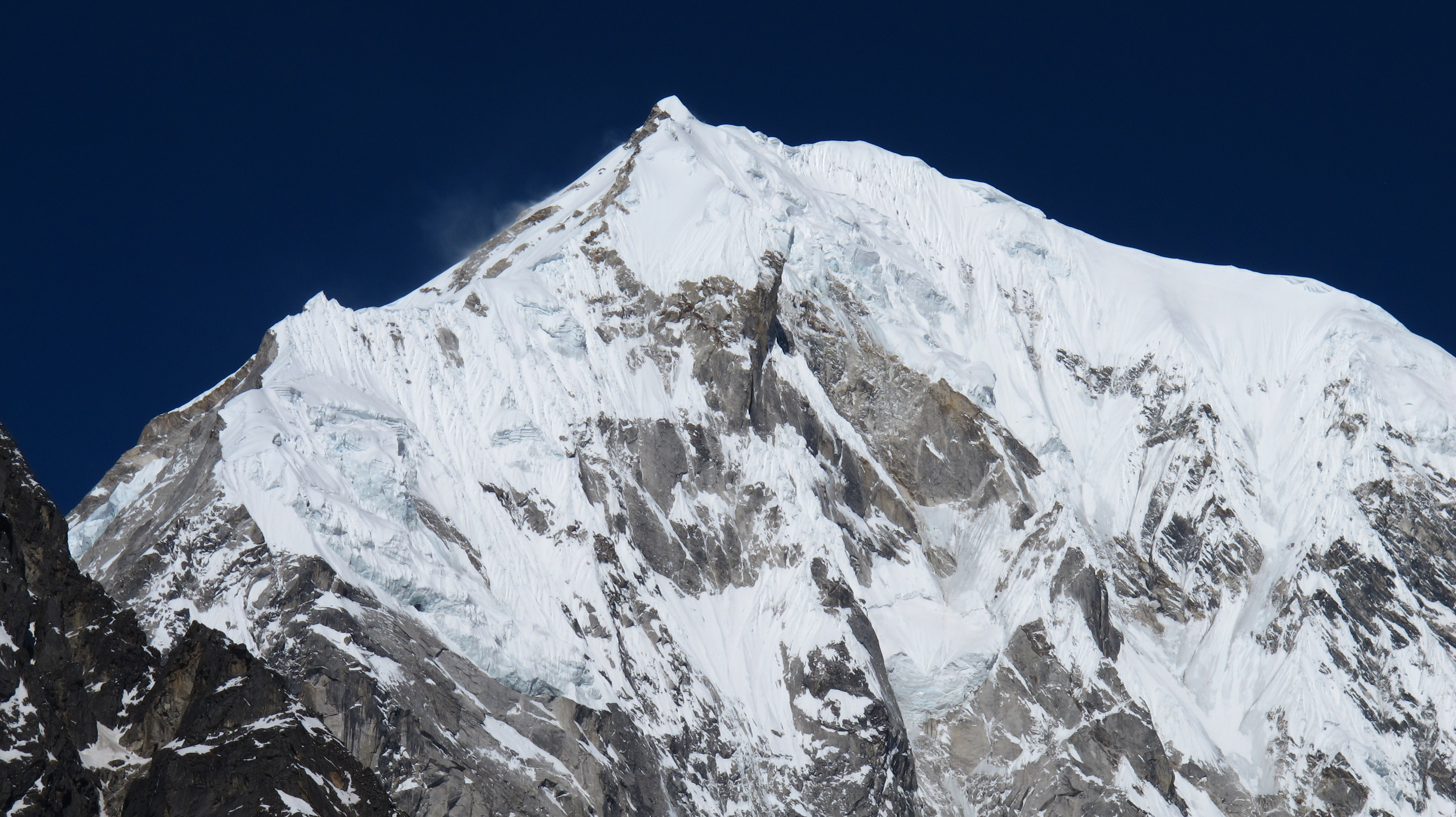
A glacier collapse on the north face of Langtang Lirung, a mountain in Langtang National Park, Nepal, is widely thought to be the proximate cause of the floods (view from south-east).

No rain was reported on the morning of 26 August at the Rasuwa district headquarters.

A seismic event measuring M_{s} 5.2 occurred at 02:52 UTC (08:37 NPT; 10:52 BJT) and was centred just north of Langtang Lirung, a mountain in Langtang National Park. The seismic event was initially believed to be an earthquake; later analysis by the United States Geological Survey (USGS) indicated that the seismic event did not precede the collapse but was rather generated by the collapse itself. The USGS' analysis found that the long-period seismic waves were consistent with a glacier collapse. The GFZ Helmholtz Centre for Geosciences (GFZ), in Potsdam, Germany, recorded an event measuring M_{w} 5.7 that was consistent with a landslide with a timestamp identical to the USGS. Other early analyses suspected a glacial lake outburst flood (GLOF).

A second landslide event was identified by USGS three hours after the first by analyzing low-frequency seismic waves. The second landslide was recorded as a M_{s} 4.2 seismic event.

Suspected glacier collapse site, yellow reticle, approximately 5,200 m.; the yellow arrow marks the beginning of the subsequent debris flow

Seven minutes after (vis. 2026 Nepal floods timeline) the seismic event, a surveillance camera captured floodwaters destroying the Gyirong Port border crossing. Geomorphologists quoted by the BBC and NPR proposed that the collapsed portion of a glacier fell thousands of metres and melted from the velocity and friction of the impact. The meltwater and rocks then displaced the river in the valley.

Bagmati Province, Nepal. The main branch of the Trishuli River is formed by the meeting of the western Kerung Khola (Gyirong Tsangpo) and the eastern Lende Khola (Donglin Tsangpo) at [1] though it is known as Bhote Koshi until near [a] where it meets the river from [d]. The Lende Khola follows the boundary between Nepal and Tibet.
- [0] location of glacier collapse that caused the flood
- [a] Dhunche, capital of Rasuwa District
- [b] Bidur, capital of Nuwakot District
- [c] Gyirong Town on the Gyirong Tsangpo in Gyirong County, Tibet
- [d] Gosaikunda lake, official source of the Trishuli River, meets the main branch close to Dhunche
- [e] Bharatpur, capital of Chitwan District on the Gandaki River (aka Narayani River)
- [f] Bagaha, city on the Gandaki in Bihar, India
- [1] Gyirong Port/Rasuwagadhi border crossing Tibet-Nepal
- [2] Syaphru, small town
- [3] Trishuli Bazar, small town
- [4] Devghat, town where the Trishuli joins the Gandaki River
- [5] Malekhu, village in Dhading District

There were indications of heavy water flow almost immediately after the seismic waves were detected. The combination of the two near-simultaneous signals, and review of the first satellite imagery, led researchers to conclude that a glacier located around 64 kilometres (40 mi) north of the capital city Kathmandu and some 15 km (9.3 mi) east of where the flood was first noticed, measuring 600 metres (2,000 ft) in width may have fallen 1,200 metres (4,000 ft), in what is known as a glacier collapse (also called an ice avalanche). According to Daniel Shugar, a geologist at the University of Calgary in Canada who reviewed satellite imagery after the event, a 0.2 km^{2} (49-acre) piece of ice and rock broke off at about 5.2 km (3.2 mi) above sea level and fell vertically about 1.2 km (0.75 mi) to the valley below.

Satellite images and seismology confirm that a glacier collapsed near Langtang Lirung, which itself is a likely result of destabilisation by tectonic uplift and climate warming. Compared to GLOFs, glacier collapse floods are less frequent in the region, but more destructive. The collapsed glacial material was believed to have originated from an altitude of 5,200–5,400 m (17,100–17,700 ft) and had a size of around 197×10^{6}–492×10^{6} m^{3} (7.0×10^{9}–17.4×10^{9} ft^{3}). It then moved north-westwards before shifting west.

The debris flowed up to some 100 km (62 mi) downstream. Seismometers over 100 kilometres (62 mi) away recorded seismic tremors caused by the floods.

=== Risk of further flooding ===
Two barrier lakes formed following the glacier collapse. On 27 August, Chinese authorities warned that one of the lakes with a volume of 2×10^{6} m^{3} (71×10^{6} ft^{3}) had formed near the confluence of the Chhochen Khola and Purepu Tsangpo rivers, adding that the possibility of a breach was high due to an expected water inflow of 3×10^{6} m^{3} (110×10^{6} ft^{3}) until 30 August. The lake overflowed slightly on 28 August, prompting Chinese authorities to briefly pause rescue operations and warn about the potential for additional flooding. The barrier lake slowly drained out and was largely empty by 30 August. The other lake was situated at a high elevation, near where the glacier collapsed. Flood warning notices were sent on 30 August after Chinese authorities reported increased water flow upstream.

== Casualties ==
Chinese surveillance camera footage showing floodwater destroying the backside of Gyirong Port, looking upstream along the Trishuli River.

As of 5 October, at least 1,455 people died, 9,287 were injured, and 5,285 were missing in Nepal. Among the missing were 650 foreign nationals from 38 countries. As of 1 October, 112 bodies had been identified.

As of 16 September, 43 people died, and 519 were missing in Tibet. Among the missing in Tibet include 261 foreign nationals from 23 countries. This includes 104 Nepali nationals.

Among the missing in Nepal include 189 Indians, 188 Nepali tourists, 65 Americans, 55 Malaysians, 54 Ukrainians, 37 Chinese, 33 Australians, 33 Latvians, 32 British, and 30 Canadians. The Chinese Ministry of Foreign Affairs reported nearly 100 Chinese citizens in Nepal missing. Australia's foreign minister said on 27 August that at least 34 of the missing were pilgrims. A group of 77 Isha Foundation pilgrims from 19 different nationalities traveling to Tibet were at Gyirong Port during the flash flood. The South Korean Foreign Ministry reported 9 citizens working at a hydropower plant construction site went missing.

At least 147 government officials, including eight local elected representatives, 32 local government employees, 11 teachers, 25 police officers, 13 Armed Police Force personnel, 45 Nepali Army personnel, 15 customs office employees, and 4 immigration office employees were reported missing. Around 622 students were also unaccounted for. An estimated 300 trade and transportation workers and 200 workers in the tourism industry were reported missing. Over 900 people involved in 12 hydropower projects were reported missing, with 500 believed to be trapped in tunnels. At the Upper Trishuli 1 Hydroelectric Project, at least 576 workers were reported missing, with around 300 trapped inside the project's tunnel. On September 7, the Nepal Army estimated that 121 people were trapped inside hydropower tunnels.

UNICEF estimated that over 84,000 people were impacted by the floods, including 32,021 children. UN spokesperson Stéphane Dujarric stated that an estimated 2,600 children younger than 5 required treatment for severe wasting and 10,500 pregnant and breastfeeding women required nutrition assistance. The Ministry of Health and Food Safety estimated that 1,500 children had moderate acute malnutrition by October 2026. Around 540 children were separated from a parent and 102 children were orphaned by the floods. UN Women estimated that 157,050 women and girls were impacted by the floods and 43,000 women and girls were in need of humanitarian aid.

The flood carried the bodies of some victims 250 km (160 mi) away, with bodies recovered as far downstream as Nawalparasi District in Nepal and Kushinagar and Maharajganj districts in Uttar Pradesh, India.

Weeks after the flood, many victims remained classified as missing rather than dead, as the death status requires a recovered body or identification. Under Nepal's Civil Code, missing persons are usually presumed dead after 12 years, although relatives of disaster victims can seek an earlier judicial declaration of death. Delays in obtaining death certificates can prevent families from accessing relief, compensation, insurance and certain benefits for orphaned children. The prolonged identification process has also intensified families' grief, with many holding symbolic funerals without recovering their relatives' remains. The Nepali prime minister stated that the government was ready to amend the law if required.

=== List of casualties ===
Nationality	Deaths		Missing		Reference
Nationality	China	Nepal	China	Nepal	Reference
China			298	37	
India			49	189	
Nepal			104	127	
United States			18	65	
Malaysia			3	54	
Ukraine			1	54	
Australia			6	35	
United Kingdom			15	32	
Canada			6	30	
South Korea				9	
Singapore				9	
Germany			3	8	
Latvia				33	
Russia			3	6	
South Africa			4	6	
Japan				5	
New Zealand			2	5	
France			2	4	
Belgium				2	
Spain			1	2	
Ireland			2	2	
Italy				2	
Kazakhstan			1	3	
Portugal			1	2	
Belarus				2	
Finland			1	1	
Hungary			1	1	
Israel				1	
Lithuania			1	1	
Estonia				2	
Netherlands			2		
Philippines				1	
Sweden				1	
Vietnam				1	
Total	Approx. 1,453		Approx. 6,664		
Total	Nepal: 1,410 bodies recovered (as of 2026-09-18) China: 43 confirmed dead (as of 2026-09-16)		Nepal: 6,145 missing China: 519 missing		

== Damage ==
Satellite imagery before and after the flooding. Trishuli (Bhotekoshi) is left, Lhende Khola at the top, Chhochen Khola top right, probable glacier scarp centre right, Langtang Lirung bottom right.

It was estimated that the resulting debris traveled at a speed of around 52 m/s (190 km/h; 120 mph), while analysis of satellite images suggests that discolorations caused by the flood reached an elevation of 800 m (2,600 ft) in a valley some 7 km (4.3 mi) from the origin. Following the flood, more than 1.5 m (4 ft 11 in) of silt was deposited in the main disaster zone. The United Nations Development Programme estimated that the flooding generated 2.2 million tonnes of debris, including 556,200 tonnes of building debris.

Floodwaters reached settlements as high as 80 metres (270 ft) above the river level.

=== Nepal ===
In Nepal, residential areas and infrastructure, including roads, sustained extensive damage. The districts of Rasuwa, Nuwakot, Dhading, Gorkha, and Chitwan were impacted by the flooding. Around 7,570 houses were destroyed, along with seven health facilities and 30 cultural sites. In Nuwakot, floodwater entered areas including Timure, Dhunche, Mailung, Syafrubesi, Betrawati, Trishuli, and Devighat. An estimate by the Nepal government reported that the floods caused over रू 277.79 billion (US$1.8 billion) in damages and रू 136.27 billion (US$883 million) in economic losses. A Rapid Damage and Needs Assessment report estimated that rebuilding costs would be around रू 723.67 billion (US$4.78 billion). A report estimated that immediate relief and short-term reconstruction costs would be रू 8.74 billion and long-term reconstruction would cost रू 714.58 billion.

The Roads Department estimated रू 30 billion in road and bridge infrastructure had been damaged, impacting 68 suspension bridges, 41 driveable bridges, and 69 km (43 mi) of road. The government deemed 33 suspension bridges damaged beyond repair. A road connecting Syafrubesi and Rasuwagadhi, part of the Trishuli Corridor (NH42), which was under reconstruction after damage from flooding in 2025, was further damaged. A bridge connected to Trishuli Bazar was swept away. A section of the Prithvi Highway from Baireni to Mugling was blocked until 28 August, while another section of the highway between Mugling and Kathmandu was closed due to erosion from the Trishuli River. Multiple villages lost road access due to the flooding, hampering relief distribution efforts by requiring air transport. Helicopters were unable to reach the village of Tiru in Rasuwa district until 9 September, 15 days after the floods began.

Around 1,806 ha (4,460 acres) of agricultural lands were damaged in the floods, while a large number of livestock were killed. The NDRRMA estimated that food production would fall by 7,686 tonnes. 64 water systems and over 10,000 toilets were damaged. Testing of 15 water sources in Bidur in September 2026 found five were contaminated with E.coli. A 4.5 km (2.8 mi) section of a pipeline providing drinking water to the area was washed away, affecting 4,000 households, while 465 households in other areas were also affected by damage to water utilities. Four flood monitoring stations were destroyed. Around 3,761 people across Rasuwa, Nuwakot and Dhading were displaced. 48 government buildings were damaged, including the rural municipality offices in Gosaikunda Rural Municipality and Uttargaya Rural Municipality which were washed away.

Eleven schools were destroyed and seven were damaged by the flooding, impacting over 9,000 students. 17 bank branches and around 4,800 commercial establishments were also damaged, including 142 hotels and 60 restaurants. The Rasuwagadhi customs office was destroyed, with more than 300 vehicles queued up at the site swept away, along with around 1,000 electric vehicles and containers with spare parts being exported into Nepal. Around 900 delivery vehicles were damaged. Over 400 shipping containers, of which over 100 were loaded, were swept away in the flooding. Nepal Telecom said 120 of its towers had been affected, while Ncell said 78 towers had been affected with losses of more than रू 90 million. The Ministry of Information and Communication estimated रू 88.51 billion in damages to the telecommunications sector. The Nepal Tourism Board estimated रू 52.67 billion in losses in the tourism sector.

The Asian Development Bank reduced Nepal's annual fiscal growth forecast from 4.5% to 4.1% growth due to the floods. The World Bank reduced Nepal's annual fiscal growth to 3.7%, largely due to disruptions from the floods. The International Labour Organization estimated that the floods disrupted the employment of 21,400 people within 4 km (2.5 mi) of the flood footprint.

==== Power infrastructure ====
Damage to electricity generation, transmission, and distribution infrastructure disrupted supplies in affected areas. 12 hydropower projects were damaged, causing over रू 100 billion in damage. Seven operational plants, including the Rasuwagadhi, Chilime, Trishuli 3A, Trishuli 3B Hub 220 kV substation, Trishuli Hydropower Station, and Devighat Hydropower Station, with a combined capacity of 256 megawatts were damaged. Projects under construction with a combined capacity of 3795 megawatts were damaged. A solar power plant with a capacity of 25 megawatts was damaged. Damage to transmission infrastructure disrupted 149.6 megawatts. Around 430.7 megawatts of power were disrupted, around 10.6% of hydropower and solar power in Nepal. The Ministry of Energy, Water Resources and Irrigation estimated रू 390.62 billion in rebuilding costs for the energy sector.

Australian tunnel rescue expert Arnold Dix, who was asked by Nepalese authorities to assist with rescue efforts at Upper Trishuli 3A Hydropower Station, where 42 workers are reported missing, said that 27 power stations were "wiped out", with 12 "destroyed, [with] nothing left at the surface".

=== China ===
In China, road access, communications, and electricity supply to the Gyirong Port area were cut off by the flood, affecting a section of China National Highway 216. Chinese rescue workers surveilled the area on 28 August, with one describing the scene as "nothing but ruins". Twenty-seven buildings were destroyed in the area. Around 80 trucks and 170 containers were stranded in the town of Gyirong after flooding destroyed about 5 km (3.1 mi) of road running from the town to Rasuwagadhi. Insurance firms estimated that the flood caused around CN¥ 450 million in damage.

Further disruptions occurred on 31 August, when Chinese authorities closed the Tatopani border crossing due to risks of landslides, leaving the Korala border crossing in Mustang District as the only open thoroughfare across the Nepal-China border.

== Response ==
=== Nepal ===
The Government of Nepal mobilised the Nepali Army, Armed Police Force, and Nepal Police, supported by helicopters and medical teams, to conduct search, rescue, and relief operations. More than 21,465 security personnel were deployed to assist rescue efforts, 9,287 personnel from the army, 7,912 from the police, and 4,203 from the APF. Bidur hosted the primary staging ground for the army's search and rescue operations. The Council of Ministers declared the area a disaster-hit zone for three months under the Disaster Risk Reduction and Management Act, 2074 (2017). The government also offered free medical treatment for those injured and financial assistance to families who lost members. On 27 August, Prime Minister Balen Shah arrived in Nuwakot District to monitor the situation. The Prime Minister's Natural Disaster Relief Fund was launched by the government, raising over रू 12.57 billion and US$19.19 million in multiple accounts for a total of रू 17.06 billion (US$110.34 million) by 7 October. By 7 October, the fund disbursed रू 1 billion in funds. Tribhuvan University donated रू 92.5 million and Kathmandu University donated रू 8.5 million towards rescue and relief efforts. The government also released रू 675 million to 15 local units in five affected districts from its Disaster Management Fund. It also announced plans to establish a Scholarship Bank to provide free schooling up to the secondary level for children displaced or orphaned by the floods. The government announced that it would send रू 15,000 per month to families whose homes had been damaged. The Nepal Electricity Administration pledged रू 50,000 and a subsistence allowance to the families of missing employees.

Nepali officials reported that over 13,795 people had been rescued by the end of formal search and rescue operations on 5 October. Initial rescue efforts were hampered by heavy rain and the absence of aviation assets by the Nepal Police. By 9 September, 1,348 flights had been conducted as part of rescue and relief efforts. As hospitals and morgues in affected areas reached full capacity, injured survivors and cadavers were transferred to other locations including Bhairahawa, Bharatpur, Butwal, Gorkha, Kathmandu, Nawalparasi, Palpa, and Pokhara. Due to a lack of cold storage, many unidentified bodies were temporarily buried until they could be identified, with DNA testing and photographs used to identify bodies. Photos of bodies were uploaded into a public online database to allow people to search for the missing. As of 1 October, 112 bodies had been identified. By 26 September, 1,044 bodies were buried, 1,334 bodies had DNA sampled and 2,060 people had DNA sampled. Some family members of the victims criticised the practice, saying that it disregarded Hindu funeral rites. Other families who had not found their deceased relatives resorted to using effigies made with kusha grass in their funeral rituals. In October 2026, the Cabinet proposed reducing the time a person is required to be missing due to a disaster to be declared legally dead from 12 years to 45 days.

Thirty-seven holding centers were established in Nuwakot, Rasuwa, and Dhading to temporarily house impacted people, housing a peak of 4,500 people. Residents of Trishuli Bazar reported looting of houses and said that very few police officers were present. Rajendra Dawadi, headteacher of Tribhuvan Trishuli secondary school in Nuwakot District, evacuated about 900 children ten minutes before the flash flood reach the school. He had received four warnings from different sources, including one from the town of Betrawati, directly upstream of the school.

Following the flooding, the Nepal Roads Department began installing bailey bridges to replace collapsed bridges. Tuins were also installed to replace collapsed pedestrian bridges. By October 16, 18 suspension bridges had been repaired. The Nepal Army delivered eight tonnes of relief supplies to Rasuwa by 27 August. The government deployed over 150 mental health professionals in Rasuwa and Nuwakot, and launched a 24/7 mental health helpline. By 3 September, over 1,239 people had received with psychological first aid, counseling, and mental health services. The government issued a three-month suspension of health insurance co-payments and enforcement of identification requirements for people seeking medical treatment in Rasuwa, Nuwakot and Dhading. It also sent 500 portable solar systems to Rasuwa as part of efforts to provide electricity to households, and deployed a fuel tanker to Trishuli for supplying aircraft engaged in relief efforts. By 9 September, 1,591 kg (3,508 lb) of food had been delivered to villages via drone. Authorities launched a cholera, tetanus-diphtheria, and measles vaccination campaign in impacted areas, with over 59,732 people vaccinated by 18 September.

The Ministry of Foreign Affairs initially turned down offers from several countries to send their search-and-rescue teams to support relief operations, citing mismanagement and poor coordination from the joint rescue effort following the 2015 earthquake as the main reason for the decision. Later, the Nepalese government allowed for the entry of experts from India, China, Australia, and South Korea for help in tunnel rescues, DNA testing and forensic examinations.

In the early hours of 31 August, a controlled explosion was carried out in a tunnel at the Upper Trishuli 3A Hydropower Station, in an effort to locate 933 missing workers. The Nepali Army then dug a hole about 10 m (33 ft) deep, using two excavators, and began to clear water, mud and debris from the tunnel. Two survivors were rescued from the tunnel on 4 September, while a Chinese national was rescued from the tunnel the next day. Rescuers deployed drones to search inside hydropower tunnels. Staff and students at Pulchowk Campus developed an automated machine to remove debris from tunnels. Separately, a woman was rescued from a buried house in Betrawati on 5 September. By 4 September, Nepal Telecom reported that 116 of its 120 impacted cellular towers had been restored and Ncell reported that 75 of its 78 impacted cellular towers had been restored. By 9 September, 83% of electricity services in Rasuwa and 95% in Nuwakot were restored.

A national day of mourning for the victims of the disaster was held in Nepal on 7 September. The Ministry of Energy, Water Resources and Irrigation created a seven-member panel of experts in hydrology, glaciology, geology, remote sensing, hydropower infrastructure and disaster risk reduction to undertake a comprehensive and scientific investigation into the cause of the floods.

Trade between China and Nepal shifted to Korala after the closure of Rasuwa and Tatopani. The NDRRMA and International Centre for Integrated Mountain Development released the Kathmandu 10 Action Points, a set of recommendations to upgrade disaster preparedness, early warning systems and emergency response and recovery, in September 2026.

The Nepal government announced that it had ended search and rescue operations on 5 October 2026.

=== China ===
CCP general secretary Xi Jinping called for continued efforts to locate missing people and improvements to disaster monitoring and warning systems. The government of the Tibet Autonomous Region mobilised nearly 800 emergency workers and 150 vehicles as well as sniffer dogs and speed boats to help the rescue efforts. Units of the People's Armed Police, the People's Liberation Army and rescue teams from neighbouring Sichuan province were deployed to assist in rescue operations. The National Fire and Rescue Administration also sent 681 personnel and 13 rescue dogs, while the Ministry of Emergency Management sent 60 personnel. Two people were rescued at Gyirong Port. Access to the site was hampered by the accumulation of debris about 3 km (1.9 mi) upstream. Chinese state media reported that 499 residents and 555 tourists had been evacuated from the area in Tibet.

Premier Li Qiang arrived in Gyirong on 26 August. The China Meteorological Administration set up portable automatic weather stations in Gyirong Port. A 4G/5G base station was installed in Gyirong County to remediate disrupted communication infrastructure. The China National Space Administration stated that it coordinated and mobilised satellite resources to perform emergency imaging of the impacted area. Rescue operator China Anneng deployed 158 personnel and 33 heavy equipment to repair roads. Road repair efforts were hampered by river currents flowing up to six times faster than normal river speeds. A makeshift road connecting to Gyirong Port was completed by 2 September. Chinese authorities arranged for the repatriation of least 114 Nepalis who were stranded in China through the Tatopani border crossing, while 576 others were repatriated through the Kodari crossing.

On the morning of 30 August, the Government of China delivered 50 tonnes of emergency relief supplies to Kathmandu via two Xi'an Y-20 transport aircraft. The supplies were handed over by Chinese ambassador Zhang Maoming to Nepalese science minister Mahabir Pun. Later that day, ambassador Zhang Maoming delivered US$2 million in emergency flood-relief assistance from the Government of China to Nepalese Finance Minister Swarnim Wagle. He also handed over an additional US$200,000 contributed by the Red Cross Society of China to Nepal's Prime Minister Disaster Relief Fund. On 1 September, a second batch of relief supplies was delivered to Nepal from China, including drones, DNA testing equipment, and water purification equipment. The government also deployed a team of tunnel experts to aid rescue efforts at hydropower station tunnels and a team of forensics experts to Nepal, as well as two bailey bridges. The National Climate Center also provided rolling climate monitoring and forecast products to its Nepalese counterparts to support rescue and relief efforts. The government donated four DJI FlyCart 100 drones to Nepal to conduct aid delivery and retrieve bodies. On 21 September, China donated रू 11 million to the Nepal Ministry of Youth and Sports.

==== Censorship and state media coverage ====
Coverage of the disaster within China ranged from outright censorship to reporting in line with the Chinese Communist Party's "public opinion guidance." Videos of the disaster taken by locals in Tibet and eyewitness accounts were censored on Chinese social media platforms. Foreign journalists may enter the region only on government-supervised trips, and that Tibetans risk punishment for speaking to them. Smaller Chinese state-media outlets initially published interviews with witnesses, but the articles were removed within hours. The Ministry of Public Security said at least 10 people were penalised for sharing misleading or disruptive posts about the disaster. China restricts the flow of information in Tibet, which it annexed in 1951 and suppresses independence protests. Chinese state media carried several broadcasts about the disaster and sent journalists to the affected area, although reports focused mainly on rescue efforts rather than the extent of the devastation. The journalists as well as social media influencers were warned against reporting casualties different from officially announced figures. A BBC headline describing coverage of the disaster as fully censored in China was changed to "heavily censored" after criticism from Chinese social media users. Several foreign journalists said that Chinese authorities denied their requests to visit the affected areas citing difficult terrain and the risk of more floods.

Restrictions on independent reporting made the extent of the damage on the Tibetan side difficult to verify. The International Campaign for Tibet said that the casualties in Tibet exceeded the figures China reported, and that up to 300 homes were destroyed. The deputy Asia director of Human Rights Watch said that Chinese state media journalists were told not to interview survivors or members of their family. In response to accusations of censorship and underreporting casualties, Guo Jiakun, spokesperson of China's foreign ministry, said the disaster should not be used for "smear campaigns and hype". On 6 September, Chinese authorities hosted a group of foreign journalists on a visit to the rescue area which had been overrun by mud. Recovered bodies were still in the process of being identified.

=== Other countries ===
International reactions to the 2026 Nepal floods
Country	Responses
Australia	Australia announced it would provide A$5 million in aid for communities affected by the floods plus A$2 million donated towards the World Food Programme, A$2 million towards the Australian Humanitarian Partnership, and A$2 million towards the Emergency Action Alliance. It also sent a team of drone operators and experts to Nepal.
Bangladesh	Foreign Minister Khalilur Rahman spoke with his Nepalese counterpart Shisir Khanal on 27 August, conveying condolences and affirming support for Nepal. The Ministry of Disaster Management and Relief sent relief supplies to the flood-affected areas of Nepal. A minute of silence was observed in the Jatiya Sangsad for the deceased victims of the floods. The government also contributed US$1 million to the disaster relief fund.
Bhutan	Bhutan contributed ₹100 million (approximately US$1.2 million) in direct financial aid to the Nepal Prime Minister's Disaster Relief Fund to support emergency relief efforts.
Canada	Canada announced CA$2 million in humanitarian assistance funding to support emergency relief efforts in Nepal, delivered through organisations including the Red Cross.
Croatia	The Croatian government authorized €500,000 in humanitarian aid to the population in flood-affected areas.
Czechia	The Czech government pledged 2.5 million Kč in aid.
Denmark	The Danish government pledged kr. 3.5 million in aid.
France	The French government delivered a shipment of humanitarian aid on 15 September.
Germany	The German government pledged US$2 million in aid.
India	Prime Minister Narendra Modi spoke to his Nepalese counterpart Balen Shah to offer humanitarian assistance and aid. By 29 August, India had sent 62 tonnes of disaster relief supplies in three airlifts. The government sent a team of rescuers and medical personnel, including forensics and tunnel rescue experts. It also sent components for three bailey bridges to Nepal.
Iran	Foreign Ministry spokesman Esmail Baghaei expressed deep sympathy with the government and people of Nepal after the deadly flood and landslide.
Ireland	The Irish government donated €500,000 to the International Federation of the Red Cross to support relief efforts in Nepal.
Israel	Israeli humanitarian organisations IsraAid and NATAN Worldwide Disaster Relief deployed emergency teams to Nepal to provide relief supplies, medical care and mental health support to affected communities.
Japan	The Japanese government, under the Japan International Cooperation Agency (JICA), agreed to send disaster relief supplies to Nepal to help in its response. The National Police Agency also sent five personnel to Nepal to assist in identification of victims. The government donated US$1 million to the International Federation of Red Cross and Red Crescent Societies to support relief efforts in Nepal.
Latvia	Latvia pledged €100,000 in aid to Nepal.
Malaysia	The Malaysian government pledged US$1 million in financial aid and stated that they would send a search-and-rescue team to Nepal.
New Zealand	The New Zealand government pledged NZ$2 million in aid.
North Korea	General Secretary of the Workers' Party of Korea Kim Jong-un extended condolences to Nepali president Ram Chandra Paudel. Kim also extended condolences to CCP general secretary Xi Jinping, expressing sympathy to the Chinese Communist Party, government and people, families of the victims.
Norway	The Norwegian government pledged kr 12.7 million in aid.
Pakistan	Prime Minister Shehbaz Sharif spoke with Nepali prime minister Balen Shah and dispatched emergency relief assistance teams to Nepal.
Philippines	President Bongbong Marcos offered his condolences to Nepal. The Philippine government, through its embassy in New Delhi and honorary consulate in Kathmandu, worked with Nepalese authorities to provide assistance to Filipinos affected by the disaster.
Qatar	The Qatar Fund for Development sent 40 tons of relief supplies to Nepal, and the Qatari International Search and Rescue Group was deployed to help distribute supplies.
Singapore	The Singaporean government agreed to send US$100,000 to the Singapore Red Cross Society already helping in the disaster relief response in Nepal. The disaster relief team, which was deployed from the Singapore High Commission in New Delhi, was primarily involved in providing consular assistance for affected Singaporeans and their families. A 35-member Singaporean forensics team was also deployed in Nepal, specializing in disaster victim identification, aerial surveillance and fingerprint examination.
South Korea	South Korea dispatched a response team and sent US$1 million in humanitarian assistance to Nepal. South Korean conglomerate Doosan Group, which was involved in the construction of Rasuwa's Upper Trishuli-1 hydropower station, pledged US$5 million in aid. It sent a team of 46 emergency responders, including tunnel rescue and forensics experts, to Nepal to aid in search-and-rescue missions. On 18 September, South Korea delivered specialized search and rescue equipment to Nepal.
Sri Lanka	President Anura Kumara Dissanayake directed the government of Sri Lanka to provide US$1 million to Nepal to support humanitarian and relief efforts.
Switzerland	The Swiss government pledged US$1 million in aid.
Taiwan	Taiwan dispatched its national search-and-rescue teams to Nepal. Executive Yuan spokesperson Michelle Lee conveyed Premier Cho Jung-tai's sorrow over the disaster and the loss of life in Nepal.
United Arab Emirates	The United Arab Emirates pledged US$10 million in humanitarian assistance and sent 186 tons of relief supplies to Nepal.
United Kingdom	Prime Minister Andy Burnham, King Charles III, and other members of the royal family expressed their solidarity with Nepal. The United Kingdom pledged £5 million in aid and offered a search-and-rescue team to assist. Tamu Dhee UK, a British Tamu organization, raised रू 13 million for relief efforts. Chhetri Society UK, a British Chhetri organization, raised रू 2.3 million for relief efforts.
United States	The United States Department of State initially pledged US$500,000 in emergency assistance to Nepal, later announcing an additional US$3.6 million in humanitarian aid that includes up to three months of emergency food assistance for approximately 10,000 affected households, as well as the deployment of a disaster response adviser. The State Department also announced US$1,000,000 in additional support to help Nepal Police in its efforts to identify victims. Another US$31 million in aid was announced by the State Department on 23 September.
Vietnam	Vietnamese leaders, including General Secretary of the Communist Party of Vietnam Tô Lâm and Prime Minister Lê Minh Hưng, extended their condolences to their counterparts in China and Nepal.

=== International organisations ===
The International Charter Space and Major Disasters, which provides humanitarian satellite data, was activated. UN secretary-general António Guterres stated that United Nations teams and partners were sending supplies and personnel to support the Nepal government-led response. The UN Central Emergency Response Fund released US$2 million to assist with medical care, shelter and water. The International Federation of Red Cross and Red Crescent Societies released CHF 1 million in assistance. The Nepal Red Cross Society released funds to provide रू 100,000 to 6,000 families impacted by the floods and delivered relief material. The World Health Organization dispatched essential emergency medical supplies and released US$150,000 in funds. Médecins Sans Frontières sent an emergency team to Nepal. The European Union allocated €2.5 million in humanitarian relief, activated its Copernicus satellite surveillance system to aid recovery efforts, and organised a Humanitarian Air Bridge to Kathmandu. UNICEF deployed a team to provide family tracing, reunification and mental health services for children. It also provided fortified flour for pregnant women, new mothers, and children in impacted areas. ShelterBox donated emergency shelter supplies for 1,000 families. The United Nations Development Programme provided specialised search and rescue equipment.

The Asian Development Bank issued a grant of US$5 million for humanitarian assistance. Welthungerhilfe provided €2 million from its emergency relief fund. The Humanitarian OpenStreetMap Team, in coordination with the Nepal government, launched a program to map buildings and roads from satellite images to help responders identify affected locations. Arsenal F.C. launched a fundraising initiative with Save the Children to provide humanitarian aid to Nepal. Nepal received US$20 million in assistance from the UN Loss and Damage Fund. Pharmaceutical company USV pledged रू 15 million in health products for the injured. inDrive donated रू 75 million to the Nepal Prime Minister's Natural Disaster Relief Fund. Aloft Kathmandu Thamel donated रू 1.5 million and provided रू 300,000 in relief materials. Beast Philanthropy launched a fundraising campaign, which raised over US$1 million by 16 September. Education Cannot Wait allocated US$5 million to support impacted children. World Wildlife Fund Nepal donated रू 15 million in relief aid. The global Non-Resident Nepali Association raised over रू 66.5 million in aid.

=== Individuals ===
Australian geologist and tunnel rescue expert Arnold Dix, located in Melbourne, helped rescuers to locate the entrances to the hydropower tunnels, in a bid to help free the people trapped in them. Dix said the rescue was the toughest rescue of his career. Nvidia CEO Jensen Huang donated US$10 million to the Prime Minister's Natural Disaster Relief Fund. The Um Hong Gil Human Foundation said its chairman, South Korean mountaineer Um Hong-gil, would lead a relief mission for affected communities beginning in late September.

== Misinformation ==
The flash flood was initially attributed in some reports and social media posts to Chinese infrastructure projects, dam construction, or hydrological activity in Tibet. (Note: Opposition from downstream countries, particularly India, to Chinese dam construction in the Himalayas predates the disaster by nearly a decade.) Subsequent satellite imagery and scientific analyses identified a glacier collapse on the Nepalese side of the border near Langtang Lirung as the immediate source of the flood. Hydrologists noted that detecting and providing advance warning for such high-altitude glacier-related failures is difficult. The flood reportedly reached Gyirong Port within minutes of the collapse, leaving little time for conventional flood-warning and evacuation measures.

Press Council Nepal launched a portal to report flood misinformation and ordered at least 72 users to remove content, including AI-generated footage and graphic images. The Nepal Police's Cyber Bureau formed a team to investigate social media users accused of posting abusive and hateful comments against flood victims. In Dhunche, residents confronted television news crews from India over accusations of sensationalism and other inappropriate behavior while covering the disaster.

== Aftermath ==
In September 2026, Nepal sought international compensation on grounds of "climate justice", citing a low contribution to global greenhouse gas emissions and its vulnerability to climate change, despite the flash flood occurring in its territory. Nepal requested 20 million USD from the United Nations Fund for Responding to Loss and Damage. The basis of the claim was the study done by World Weather Attribution, which concluded that climate change was a contributing factor in the rock and ice avalanche.

At the COP31 summit, a member of Nepal’s delegation confirmed that the country has received the first payout from the United Nations.

== See also ==
- 2026–2027 El Niño event
- List of flash floods
- List of deadliest floods
- Floods in China
- 2026 Budhi Gandaki flood
- Other major mass movements in the vicinity
  - Tsergo Ri landslide, one of the Earth's largest known mass movements, ca. 10 km to the south-east, prehistoric
