= Rajendra Dawadi =

Survivor of the 2026 Nepal flash floods

- राजेन्द्र दवाडी
- Born: 1979 (age 46–47)
- Citizenship: Nepal
- Education: Tribhuvan Trishuli Secondary School
- Occupation: Principal (Headmaster) cum English subject teacher
- Organization: Tribhuvan Trishuli Secondary School
- Known for: Saving 900 students from the sudden flash floods in 2026 in Nepal

Rajendra Dawadi (Nepali: राजेन्द्र दवाडी) is a Nepalese school principal and teacher. He is the principal of Tribhuvan Trishuli Secondary School, which was located in Trishuli Bazar of Nuwakot district. He received wider national and international media attention in August 2026 for evacuating 900 students from the school shortly before 2026 Nepal floods destroyed the school building.

== Early life ==
Rajendra Dawadi was born in 1979 in Trishuli Bazar, Nuwakot. He attended Tribhuvan Trishuli Secondary School to complete his secondary education.He later became a teacher and principal at the school.

== 2026 evacuation ==
On 26 August 2026, Dawadi received warnings of a flash flood approaching the Trishuli Bazar area. The school staff, including the security guard and accountant, received warnings by telephone. At the same time, Dawadi also received information from a contact in Betrawati, a village located roughly 5 miles (8.0 km) upstream from the Trishuli Bazar, was swept away by the floods, and urged Dawadi to run to higher ground.

Dawadi cancelled all running classes and instructed students and staff at the school to move to higher ground. Approximately 900 of the school's 1,643 enrolled students were present at the school at the time. He also instructed school bus drivers to evacuate students and made contact to those drivers who were still en route to the school, telling them to turn back to safe place.

The school building was swept away by the flood, less than 15 minutes after the initial warning. Two members of the school staff who were unable to reach higher ground were reported missing. Dawadi, along with the students and staff who evacuated, reached higher ground before the flood reached the school.

== Praises ==
Indian billionaire Anand Mahindra praised him through his social media tweet.
