= Tuin =

Tuin may refer to:

- Tuin (aerial lift), a type of hand-powered aerial lift traditional to the Himalaya
- Tuin, Iran, a village in Hamadan Province, Iran
- Tuin, Kičevo, a village in Kičevo municipality, Republic of Macedonia
- Tuin Island, an island featured in Lucy Irvine's book Castaway
