= 2025 Nepal floods =

Flood in Nepal

Multiple floods occurred in Nepal in 2025.

== List of major floods ==
=== Tilgau ===
In early May 2025, a sudden glacial lake outburst flood (GLOF) occurred in the remote Himalayan village of Tilgau, Humla (Namkha Rural Municipality Ward No. 6) on the night of 14 May . Two small glacial lakes burst, triggering an ice-and-debris avalanche that destroyed five wooden bridges, damaged homes, irrigation and hydropower infrastructure, and displaced around 32 villagers into temporary shelters. No rainfall had been reported at the time, suggesting the event was triggered by glacial instability rather than a storm.

=== Rasuwagadhi flood ===
A severe flash flood on 8 July 2025, caused by monsoon rains and a likely glacial lake outburst, swept away the Friendship Bridge over Nepal’s Trishuli River at Rasuwagadhi. The disaster left at least nine people dead, dozens missing (including Nepali and Chinese workers), destroyed hundreds of parked trucks and electric vehicles, and halted cross-border commerce. Rescue operations by Nepalese army and authorities rescued around 55 people, while multiple bodies were recovered. Prime Minister Khadga Prasad Oli visited the site as relief efforts intensified. The flood was later confirmed to have been caused by outburst of a supraglacial lake in the Tibet region of China.

== See also ==
- 2024 Nepal floods
- 2026 Nepal floods
