= Mailung Khola Hydropower Station =

- Location within Nepal
- Official name: Mailung Khola Hydropower Project
- Country: Nepal
- Coordinates: 28.1092°N 85.29211°E
- Purpose: Power
- Status: Operational
- Owner: Mailun Khola Hydropower Company Pvt. Ltd

Dam and spillways
- Type of dam: Gravity
- Impounds: Mailung River

Power Station
- Commission date: 2071-03-19 BS
- Type: Run-of-the-river
- Installed capacity: 5 MW

Mailung Khola Hydropower Station (Nepali: मैलुन्ङ खोला जलविद्युत आयोजना) is a run-of-river hydro-electric plant located in Rasuwa District of Nepal. The flow from Mailung River, a tributary of Trisuli River, is used to generate 5 MW electricity. The plant is owned and developed by Mailun Khola Hydropower Company Pvt. Ltd, an IPP of Nepal. The plant started generating electricity from 2071-03-19 BS. The generation licence will expire in 2094-12-30 BS, after which the plant will be handed over to the government. The power station is connected to the national grid and the electricity is sold to Nepal Electricity Authority.

The plant was impacted by the 2026 Nepal–Tibet floods; as of 23 September, 7 people remain missing at the site.

== See also ==
- List of power stations in Nepal
