= Upper Trishuli 1 Hydroelectric Project =

Upper Trishuli-1 Hydroelectric Project
- Location: Rasuwa District, Nepal
- Status: Under construction
- Owners: Nepal Water and Energy Development Company

Dam and spillways
- Type of dam: Diversion dam
- Height: 29.5 m
- Length: 100.9 m

Power Station
- Type: Run-of-the-river
- Turbines: 3 × 72 MW
- Installed capacity: 216 MW

The Upper Trishuli-1 Hydroelectric Project (UT-1) is a 216 MW run-of-the-river hydroelectric project under construction on the Trishuli River in Rasuwa District, Nepal. The project is being developed by Nepal Water and Energy Development Company Private Limited (NWEDC), and the electricity generated is intended for domestic consumption through the Nepal Electricity Authority (NEA).

== Development ==
The project is being developed by Nepal Water and Energy Development Company Private Limited (NWEDC), a Nepalese special purpose vehicle established for the project. International Finance Corporation (IFC) has been involved in the project's development through IFC InfraVentures since 2012.

Land acquisition for the project affected 38 land plots and 36 structures, with impacts on 154 families. Most of the land required for the project was acquired in 2012–2013, while a further 8 hectares was purchased in 2018 for worker camps following the 2015 earthquake.

A Project Development Agreement (PDA) was signed between the Government of Nepal's Ministry of Energy, Water Resources and Irrigation and NWEDC on 29 December 2016. Under the PDA, the project company is responsible for the design, engineering, financing, construction, completion, commissioning, ownership, operation and maintenance of the project, followed by transfer under the agreement.

A 30-year power purchase agreement (PPA) between NWEDC and the Nepal Electricity Authority was signed on 28 January 2018. The agreement provides for the sale of electricity for domestic consumption and uses a run-of-river tariff structure with separate wet- and dry-season rates.

The project received financing from several international development and financial institutions. In 2019, the Asian Development Bank approved a $60 million financing package comprising a $30 million ordinary capital resources loan and a $30 million loan from the Canadian Climate Fund for the Private Sector in Asia II. The project also formed part of a wider financing package arranged by IFC and other international lenders.

== Construction ==
Preparatory activities for the project included land acquisition, access-road works, worker camps and other infrastructure before the start of the main civil works.

Construction activities began in 2021. Contemporary reports stated that civil construction formally began with a tunnel blast in August 2021, while NWEDC states that the project's main construction works began in December 2021.

The project has a planned construction period of five years. As of June 2026, the Asian Development Bank reported that the project remained under construction.

In 2025, a glacial lake outburst flood caused damage to some project facilities while construction was ongoing and significantly altered the morphology of the Trishuli River. The project continued to be monitored for environmental and social impacts following the event.

In August 2026, the project was severely affected by the 2026 Nepal–Tibet floods in the Trishuli River corridor. Flooding on 26 August damaged structures at the construction site, including the dam site, project camp and control building. A preliminary damage assessment reported estimated losses of NPR 1.95 billion at Upper Trishuli-1. At least 576 workers were reported missing, with around 300 trapped inside the project's tunnel. A trapped worker was rescued from a tunnel related to the power station 10 days after the floods. As of 23 September, 439 people remained missing, 955 people were rescued, and 39 bodies were recovered from the site.

== Design ==
The project is a run-of-the-river scheme with an installed capacity of 216 MW. Its main structures include a diversion dam, underground desander, headrace tunnel, surge tank and underground powerhouse.

The diversion dam is described as approximately 100.9 m wide and 29.5 m high. It is located in a narrow gorge on the Trishuli River, approximately 275 m downstream from the confluence of the Langtang Khola and Bhote Khosi River, about 70 km north-east of Kathmandu. The dam creates an approximately 2.1-hectare impoundment.

Water is diverted through two intake tunnels, each with a gate size of 3.35 m by 6.50 m, with a combined intake-tunnel length of approximately 285 m. The design discharge is up to 76 m³/s, and the diverted water passes through the powerhouse before returning to the Trishuli River approximately 10.7 km downstream of the dam.

The powerhouse has three generating units rated at 72 MW each, giving a total installed capacity of 216 MW.

The project includes a new Chilime–Trishuli transmission connection through a 1.1 km high-voltage extension from the project's take-off yard. An approximately 11.84 km access road is also associated with the project, linking the dam and powerhouse areas.

The project's expected annual generation is approximately 1,427 GWh according to project documentation. NWEDC separately gives an annual gross energy production figure of 1,533.06 GWh and identifies 1,456 GWh as the PPA contract energy.

== Environmental and social impacts ==
The project is classified as category A for environment, involuntary resettlement and Indigenous Peoples under the Asian Development Bank's safeguard framework.

The project's environmental impacts include permanent loss of 2.61 hectares of natural habitat and temporary use of 4.16 hectares of modified habitat for a workers' camp in the buffer zone of Langtang National Park. The project also reduces downstream flows and alters aquatic habitat along an approximately 10.7 km dewatered section of the Trishuli River.

The project includes a Biodiversity Management Plan and measures intended to reduce impacts on aquatic biodiversity. These measures include a fish ladder and minimum environmental flows intended to support the migration of common snow trout (Schizothorax richardsonii). The environmental-flow assessment concluded that 10% of mean monthly flow would be adequate to maintain aquatic habitat and connectivity within the diversion reach.

Land acquisition affected 154 families. The project footprint covers approximately 109 hectares, of which about 31 hectares are required permanently and about 78 hectares temporarily. Approximately 85 hectares are government-owned, while the remainder consists of private and guthi land.

More than 90% of the affected families are Tamang and less than 5% are Gurung. Both groups are recognized under the Constitution of Nepal as Indigenous nationalities, or Adivasi Janajati. Project impacts on Indigenous Peoples include acquisition of community forest user group land and water resources and limited relocation of Indigenous families.
