= Upper Trishuli 3A Hydropower Station =

Hydropower station in Rasuwa District, Nepal

- Location within Nepal
- Official name: Upper Trishuli 3A Hydropower Project
- Country: Nepal
- Location: Rasuwa District
- Coordinates: 28°1′21″N 85°12′38″E
- Purpose: Power
- Status: Non-operational
- Owner: Mai Valley Hydropower P Ltd.

Dam and spillways
- Type of dam: Gravity
- Impounds: Trisuli River

Power Station
- Operator: NEA
- Commission date: 30 August 2019
- Type: Run-of-the-river
- Installed capacity: 60 MW

Upper Trishuli 3A Hydropower Station (Nepali: माथिल्लो त्रिशुली ३a जलविद्युत आयोजना) is a run-of-river hydroelectric plant located in Rasuwa District of Nepal. The flow from the Trishuli River was used to generate 60 MW of electricity, but the plant has since been severely impacted by the 2026 Nepal floods.

== Background ==
The plant is owned and developed by Nepal Electricity Authority (NEA). The plant started generating electricity on 30 August 2019. The generation licence expires on 2102-11-14 BS.

The power station is connected to the national grid.

The total project cost was US$125.775 million. The project was funded by the Government of Nepal through NEA and a loan provided by China Exim Bank.

== 2026 floods ==
On 26 August 2026, the station was severely damaged and possibly destroyed beyond repair by an enormous flash flood and mudslide that made its way down from the Chinese-Nepalese border. As of 30 August, Nepalese emergency services are trying to locate and rescue hundreds of workers believed to have been trapped by the catastrophe in tunnels under the power plant.

Australian geologist, engineer, and tunnel rescue expert Arnold Dix, who was asked by Nepalese authorities to assist with rescue efforts at the power station, said on 2 September that 42 workers were reported missing from this plant. He believes that survival may be possible within the 33-metre (108 ft) facility underneath the mountains, in a "Goldilocks zone" at the top of the underground building. Rescuers are attempting to drill vertically from outside, aiming to break through the reinforced concrete roof section. However, rescue efforts are hampered by weather and lack of access after roads had been washed away.

On 4 September 2026, nine days after the flood, two workers were rescued from within the tunnel system. As of 23 September, 39 people remain missing at the site.

== See also ==
- List of power stations in Nepal
