= Devighat =

Place in Nuwakot, Nepal

Trishuli and Tadi River, Devighat

Devighat Dham is in the Nuwakot District of Nepal’s Central Development Region. It is about 60 km north of Kathmandu, near the confluence of the Trishuli River and Tadi River.

Prithvi Narayan Shah died in Devighat Dham.

== Nepal flood ==
In the recent flood in August 2026, the Old City of Devighat faced widespread destruction and practically only around 1% of the homes are reported to have been spared. Schools, bridges and lots of things have been washed away by the flood.

== See also ==
- Nuwakot, Bagmati
- Bidur
- Kakani Rural Municipality
