= Trishuli Hydropower Station =

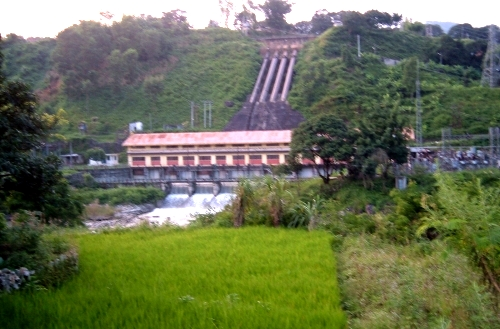

- Location within Nepal
- Country: Nepal
- Location: Nuwakot
- Coordinates: 27.922745135301923°N 85.14617262836678°E
- Purpose: Power
- Status: Operational
- Opening date: 1967
- Owner: Nepal Electricity Authority

Dam and spillways
- Type of dam: Gravity
- Impounds: Trishuli River
- Height: 5 m (16 ft)
- Length: 139.6 m (458 ft)

Trishuli Hydropower Station
- Coordinates: 27.922745135301923°N 85.14617262836678°E
- Commission date: 1967
- Type: PRoR
- Hydraulic head: 51.4 m (169 ft)
- Turbines: (7 units) 3.5 MW eachFrancis-type; Horizontal
- Installed capacity: 37 MW

Trishuli Hydropower Station is a peaking run-of-river hydropower station located at Trishuli bazaar of Nuwakot district in Nepal. The plant was constructed in 1967 with an installed capacity of 21 MW (6 units, 3.5 MW each). The plant was upgraded to 24 MW (7 units, 3.5 MW each). The project was developed jointly by the Government of India and the Government of Nepal. The project cost was INR 140 million. The annual energy generation is 304.78 GWh. Nepal Electricity Authority, a government-run organization, owns and operates this plant. Another power station Devighat Hydropower Station is a cascade project to this power station.

The design flow is 45.66 m^{3}/s and the rated head is 51.4 m.

The plant was damaged during the 2026 Nepal floods. Transmission lines and substations were also damaged, disrupting electricity services in Nuwakot and Rasuwa. As of 23 September, 3 employees remain missing at the site.

== See also ==
- Nepal Electricity Authority
