= Trishuli Bazar =

Destroyed town of Nepal

Trishuli Bazar त्रिशुली बजार Trishuli Bazaar
- Town
- Interactive map of Trishuli Bazar
- Coordinates: 27.9225637°N 85.1496126°E
- Country: Nepal
- Province: Bagmati Province
- District: Nuwakot
- Municipality: Bidur
- 2026 Nepal flash floods: 26 August 2026
- Named for: Trishuli river

The Trishuli Bazar (Nepali: त्रिशुली बजार) in the Himalayan nation of Nepal refers to a decades-old trading settlement and market town in the Bidur Municipality of the Nuwakot district in the Bagmati Province. It was a tourist destination for foreigners and Hindu pilgrimage. It is situated near the bank of the Trishuli river in Nepal. On 26 August 2026, the market town of the Trishuli Bazar was washed away by the sudden deadly flash floods emerged from the autonomous Tibetan region. The town has been completely destroyed and buried under the silt deposited by the flash floods.

Before the flash floods, it was a busy marketplace in the district of Nuwakot. Due to the devastating flash floods in 2026, the market areas along with the residential settlement have been presently reduced to ruins. On 26 August 2026, around 60 houses of the Trishuli Bazar were swept away by the flash floods. The remaining houses in the town along the Trishuli riverside have been submerged either partially or completely in the muddy water and silt deposited due to the flash floods.

== Etymology ==
The market town was named after the sacred river Trishuli. The river is believed to be sacred in the tradition of Hinduism in the Indian subcontinent. The Indic term Trishuli has some religious and legendary significance in the Hindu tradition. The market was situated on the bank of the Trishuli river.

== Description ==
Before the flash floods, there was a temple dedicated to Lord Rama. It was called Ram Mandir. In front of the temple, there was a school having three-storyed concrete building. The principal of the school is Rajendra Dawadi. In this school around 1600 students were studying. It was situated around 60 metres above the river. The Trishuli Bazar was once a bustling market town, lined with jewellery shops, apparel stores and other businesses activities.

It has been an important stopover for pilgrims, mountaineers, and tourists heading to the high-altitude Rasuwa district and across the border into Tibet. It was also an important stopover for the pilgrimage of the Hindu religious Kailash Mansarovar Yatra through Nepal route. The bustling market of the Trishuli Bazar was a centre of attraction for the local as well as foreign customers arriving in the town. At the outskirts of the town, there is hydropower plant called Trishuli Hydropower Station for production of electricity. The plant was damaged during the deadly flash floods 2026 in Nepal. It was built by the financial assistance of the Government of India under the mutual friendship relation between the two culturally tied nation.
