= Tuin (aerial lift) =

A tuin is a type of hand-powered aerial lift that is used in the Himalayas to cross fast flowing rivers, deep gorges and to get to other surrounding areas where there aren’t any bridges. It is mostly used in undeveloped areas in countries like Nepal where bridges or safer options are hard to construct or very expensive. This type of aerial lift can hold a small amount of people, but the number depends on the weight limit and size of the platform.

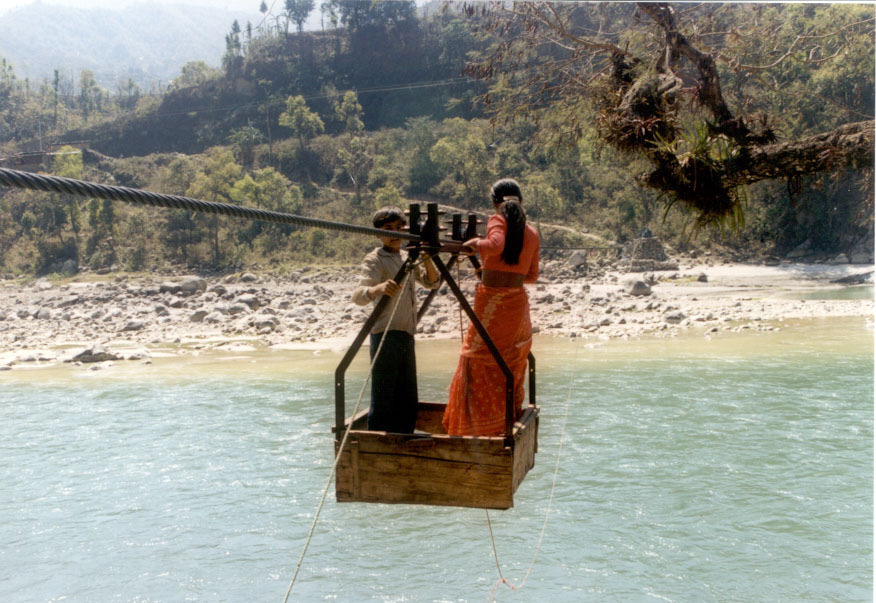
A tuin being used in Nepal

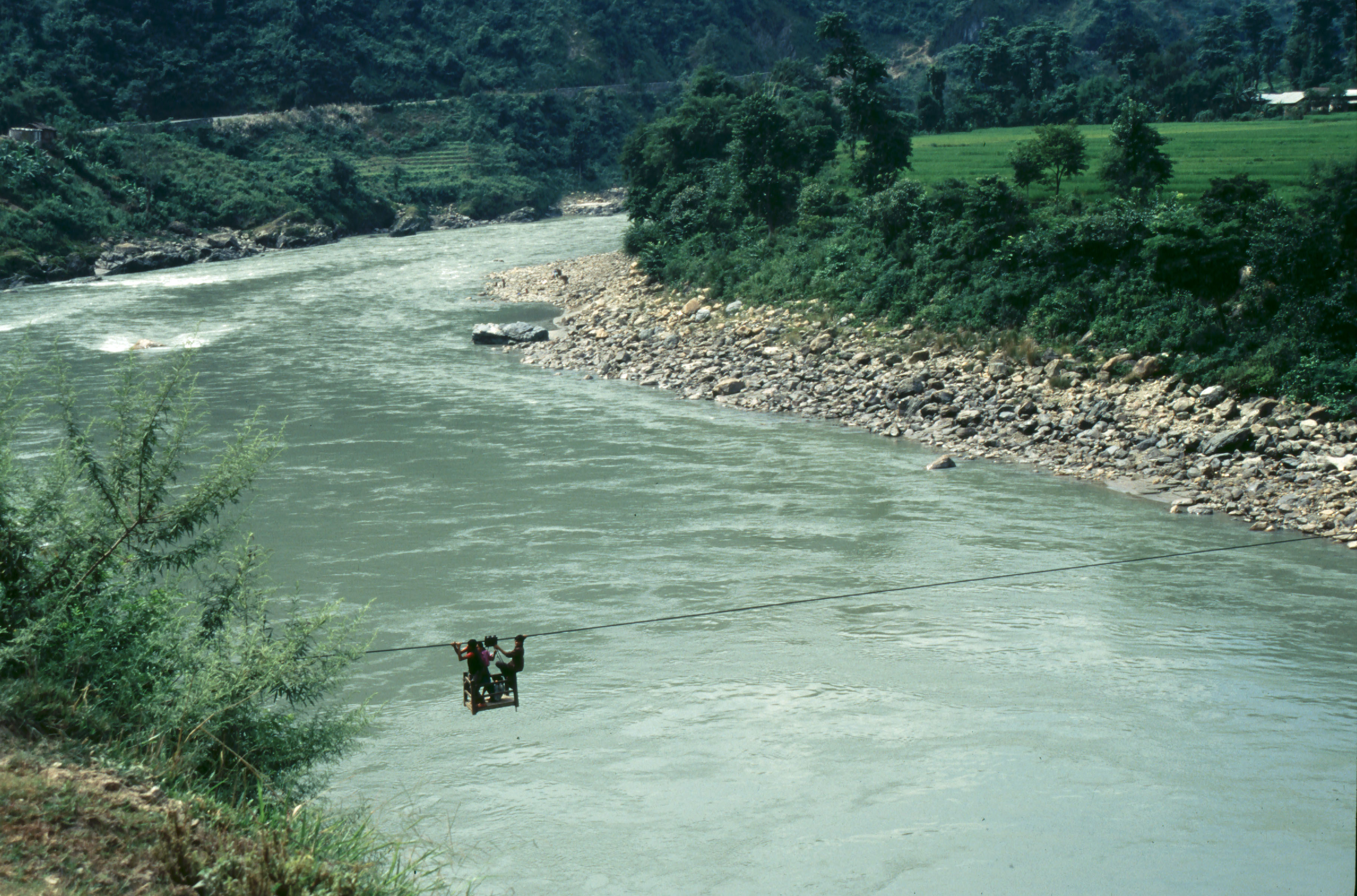
Trishuli River being crossed with a tuin

== Method of usage ==
The tuin has a relatively simple mechanism. A seat is held up by a heavy duty rope with the passenger standing up and pulling themselves forward hand over hand along the rope.

== 2026 Nepal–Tibet floods ==
During the 2026 Nepal–Tibet floods, most pedestrian bridges were destroyed by the floods and tuins were installed to replace them.

== Replacement ==
The tuin is being replaced by bridges in many towns due to the danger of falling, lack of any safety features like brakes and taking a lot of strength to use, and lack of supervision, but many of them still exist in remote areas.

== See also ==
- Aerial Lift
