= Baireni =

Baireni बैरेनी
- Village development committee
- Location in Nepal
- Coordinates: 27.76°N 84.98°E
- Country: Nepal
- Zone: Bagmati Zone
- District: Dhading District

Population (1991)
  - Total: 11,821
  - Religions: Hindu
- Time zone: UTC+5:45 (Nepal Time)
- Website: http://baireni.com

Baireni is a village development committee in Dhading District in the Bagmati Zone of central Nepal. At the time of the 1991 Nepal census, it had a population of 11,821.
