= National Disaster Risk Reduction and Management Authority =

Nepal government agency

- राष्ट्रिय विपद् जोखिम न्यूनीकरण तथा व्यवस्थापन प्राधिकरण

Agency overview
- Formed: 15 November 2019
- Type: Strategic Emergency Management
- Headquarters: Singha Darbar, Kathmandu
- Agency executive: Dharam Raj Uprety, Chief Executive
- Parent department: Ministry of Home Affairs
- Website: https://ndrrma.gov.np/en/

National Disaster Risk Reduction and Management Authority (NDRRMA; Nepali: राष्ट्रिय विपद् जोखिम न्यूनीकरण तथा व्यवस्थापन प्राधिकरण) is a central resource body of Government of Nepal responsible for coordinating and implementing disaster risk reduction and management activities in the country. Established under the Disaster Risk Reduction and Management Act, 2017, the authority operates under the Ministry of Home Affairs and is responsible for disaster preparedness, risk assessment, mitigation, response, recovery and rehabilitation. NDRRMA also coordinates disaster-related activities among federal, provincial and local governments and maintains national disaster information and early warning systems.
