= Betrawati Bazaar =

Destroyed town of Nepal

Betrawati Bazaar बेत्रावती बजार Betrawati
- Market town
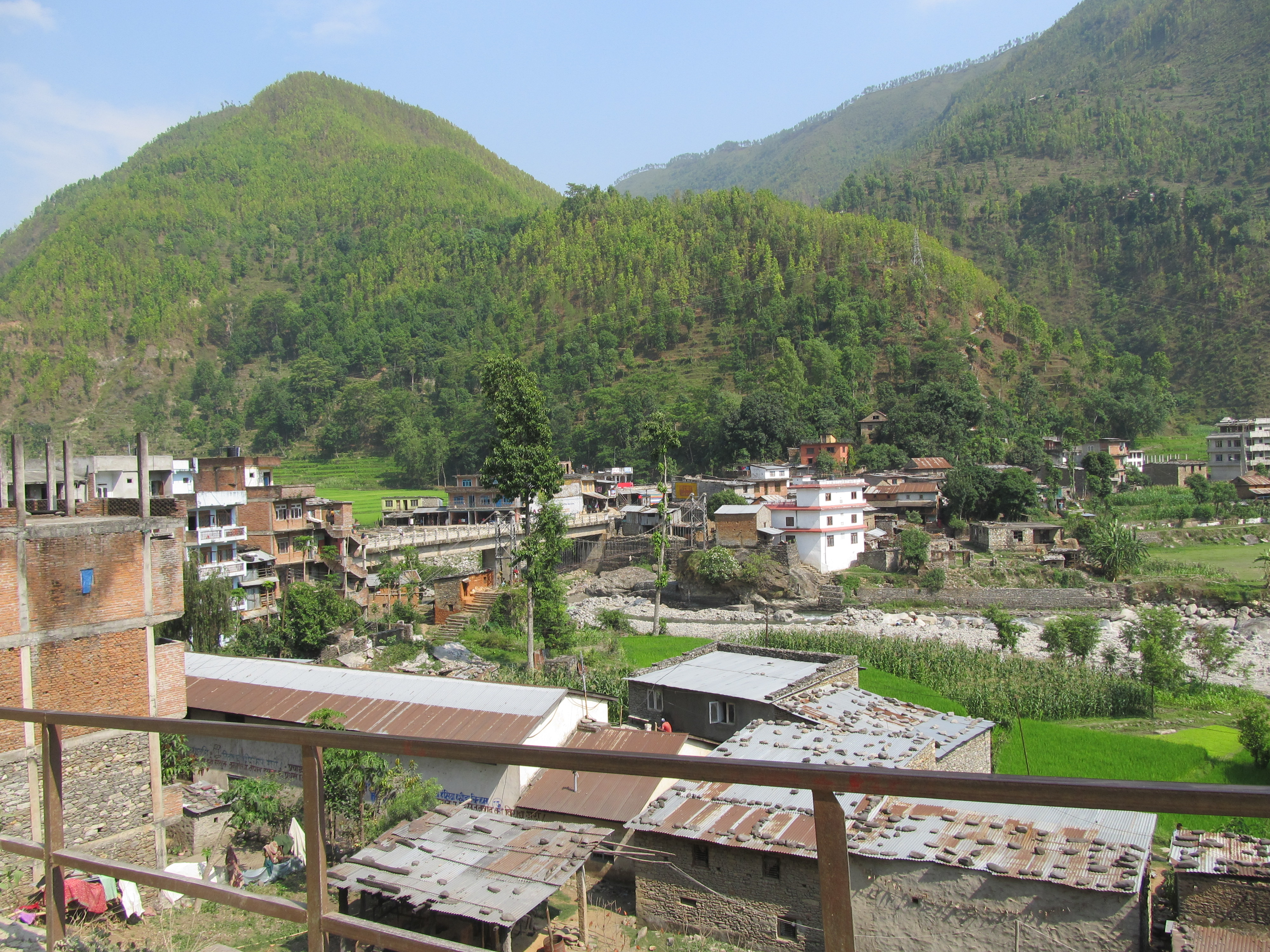
- A panoramic view of the Betrawati Bazaar (Photo captured on 16 May 2011).
- Interactive map of Betrawati Bazaar
- Country: Nepal
- Province: Bagmati
- District: Rasuwa
- Municipality: Uttargaya
- Destroyed by 2026 Nepal flash floods: 26 August 2026
- Named after: Betrawati River

Betrawati Bazaar (Nepali: बेत्रावती बजार) in the Himalayan nation of Nepal refers to the destroyed market town during the flash floods 2026. During the flooding, most of the buildings in the town were washed away or overturned. It is located in the Uttargaya Municipality of the Rasuwa district in the Bagmati Province of Nepal. According to a local resident, the population of the town was around 1000. Its distance from the Nepal-Tibet border is about 45 kilometers. It is a historical place associated with the historical Treaty of Betrawati between Nepal and Tibet. The treaty was signed after the Tibet-Nepal war in 1792.

== Earlier description ==
In the market of Betrawati Bazaar, there were several shops, bus stop that provides link to the Kathmandu valley. The market town holds Krishna Mandir and Ram Mandir. On the occasions of the Ram Navami and Krishna Janmashtami, huge crowds of devotees were gathering at these temples for ritualistic worship and darshan of the deities. The Betrawati Bazaar holds an old Newar settlement.
