= Rasuwa Fort =

Historic fort at the China–Nepal border

- रसुवागढी (Nepali)
- Rasuwa Gadhi; Rasuwagadhi
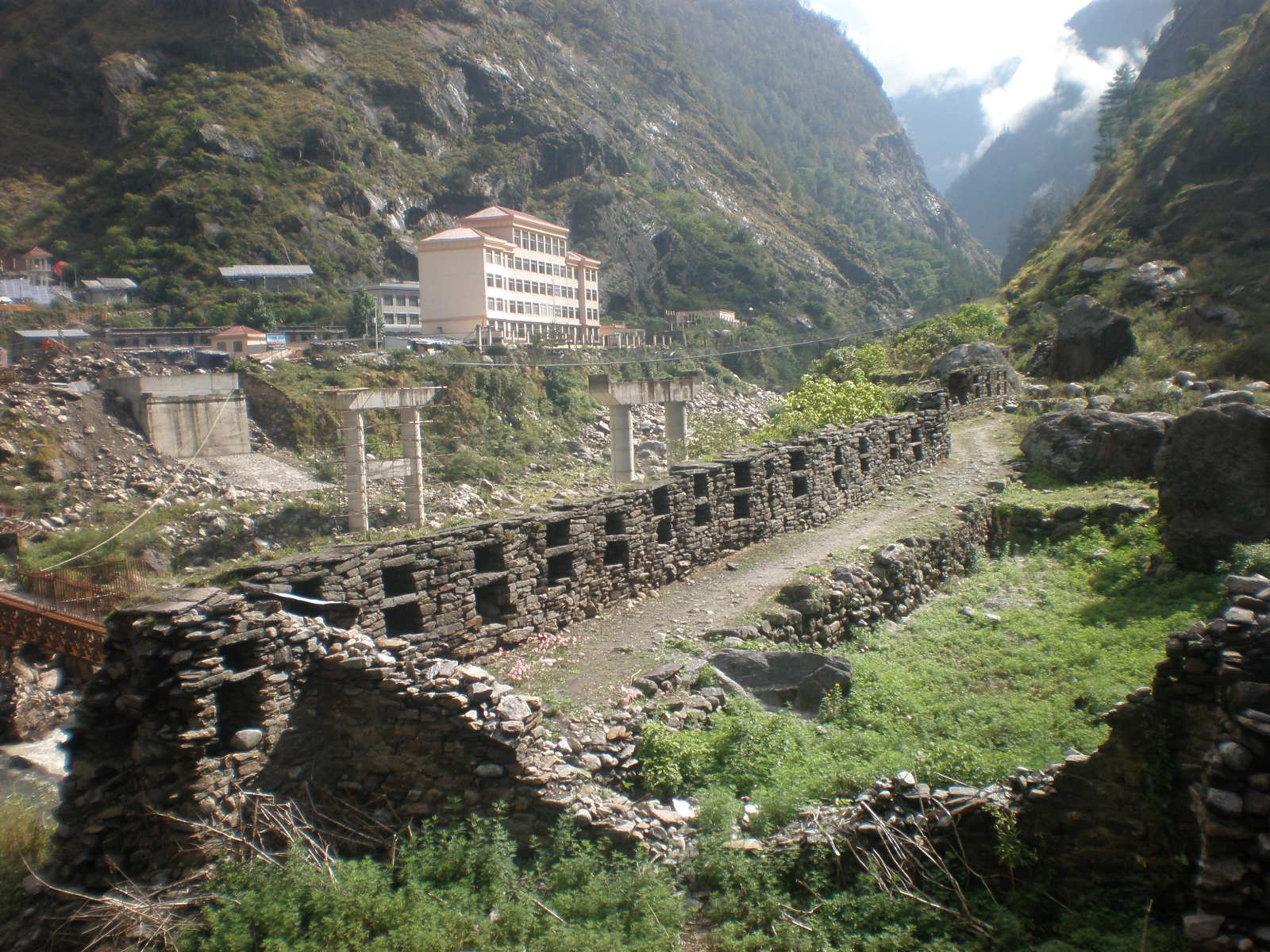
- Rasuwa Fort in 2013, with construction of the Miteri Bridge and the then Chinese border facilities in the background
- Interactive map of Rasuwa Fort
- 28°16′40″N 85°22′40″E
- Type: Fort
- Periods: Rana dynasty
- Location: Rasuwa District, Bagmati Province, Nepal

History
- Built: 1855

Site notes
- Condition: Ruins

Rasuwa Fort, also known as Rasuwa Gadhi or Rasuwagadhi (रसुवागढी), is a historic fortification at Rasuwagadhi in Rasuwa District, Nepal, beside the border with the Tibet Autonomous Region of China. It stands near the confluence of the Lhende Khola and Kerung Khola, whose combined flow is known on the Nepalese side as the Bhote Koshi, part of the Trishuli River, within Langtang National Park. The Gyirong–Rasuwagadhi border crossing and the site of the Miteri Bridge are immediately beside the fort.

== History ==
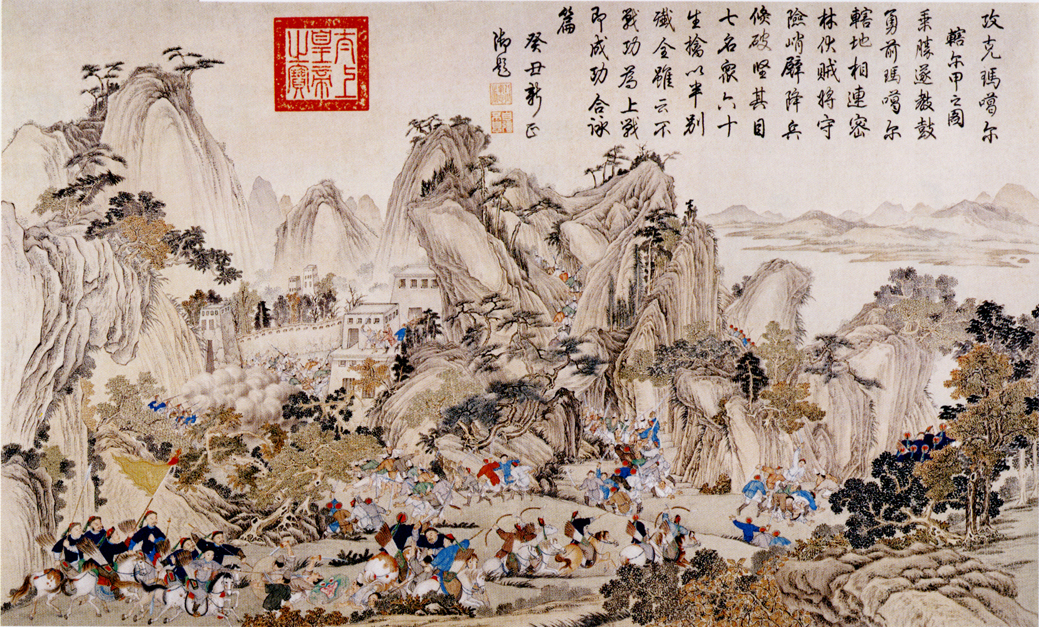
The 1792 battle as depicted in a Chinese painting

The area was the site of a three-day battle during the second campaign of the Sino-Nepalese War in July 1792.

The present fort was constructed in 1855 during the Nepalese–Tibetan War, when the government of Jung Bahadur Rana invaded Qing-ruled Tibet.

A 2020 management plan for Langtang National Park identified stone removal, quarrying and the collection of sand and aggregate at the foot of the fort as conservation concerns. It recommended protecting the river confluence, controlling encroachment and developing a long-term restoration plan.

== Border crossing and road ==
Nepal and China agreed in 2012 to develop Rasuwagadhi as a formal border crossing. The crossing opened for trade in December 2014 and subsequently became an important alternative to the Zhangmu–Kodari crossing.

The Nepalese approach to the fort and border crossing is the northernmost section of the Trishuli Corridor (National Highway 42, NH42). The highway runs beside the fort and terminates at Rasuwagadhi. It connects the site southward with Timure, Syaphrubesi, Mailung, Betrawati and Galchhi. The Department of Roads lists the approximately 18-kilometre (11 mi) Syaphrubesi–Rasuwagadhi section as NH42. The road's alignment immediately beside the historic site, together with landslides affecting the surrounding slopes, has been identified as a conservation concern.

The Miteri Bridge linked the end of NH42 with Gyirong Port on the Chinese side, from which the road continued towards Gyirong Town.

== Flood damage ==
A flood on 8 July 2025 destroyed the Miteri Bridge and severely damaged the Syaphrubesi–Rasuwagadhi road and the nearby customs facilities. Around one kilometre of the road was washed away, temporarily cutting road access between Timure and Rasuwagadhi.

The border area was struck again during the 2026 Nepal floods on 26 August. The border-crossing complex was destroyed and flooding damaged the road between Betrawati and Rasuwagadhi at multiple locations, washing away several bridges and once again severing access to the border.
