= Betrawati, the Uttar Gaya =

Hindu pilgrimage in Nepal

Uttar Gaya, also called Betrawati, is a Hindu pilgrimage site in the Nuwakot District of Nepal, about 80 km north of Kathmandu.
