= Syaphru =

- Village development committee
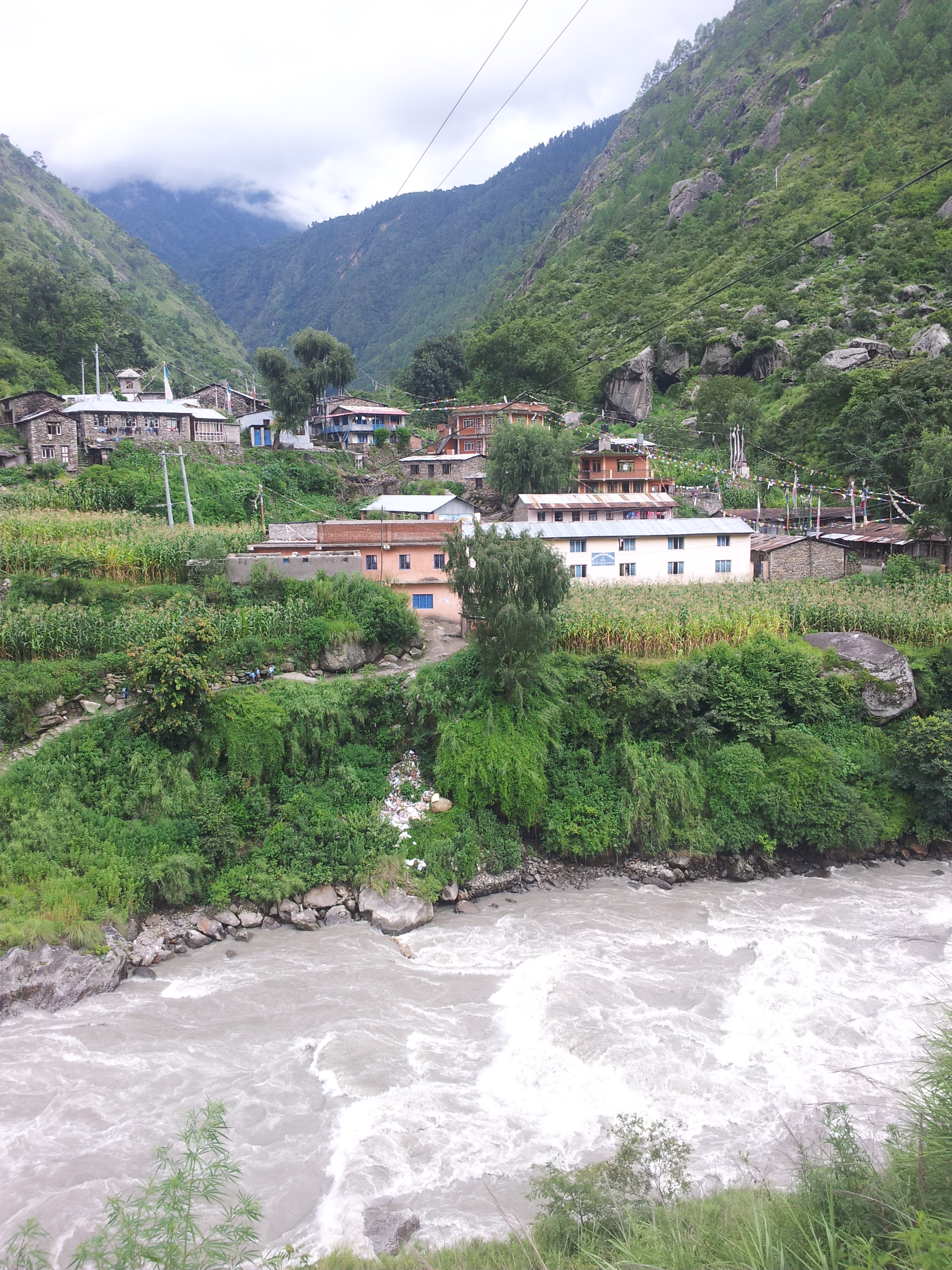

- Location in Nepal
- Coordinates: 28.163522°N 85.336325°E
- Country: Nepal
- Zone: Bagmati Zone
- District: Rasuwa District

Population (2021)
  - Total: 450
- Time zone: UTC+5:45 (Nepal Time)

Syaphru or Syabru is a village development committee in Rasuwa District in the Bagmati Zone of northern Nepal. As of the 2021 Nepal census, it had a population of 450 people.

== History ==
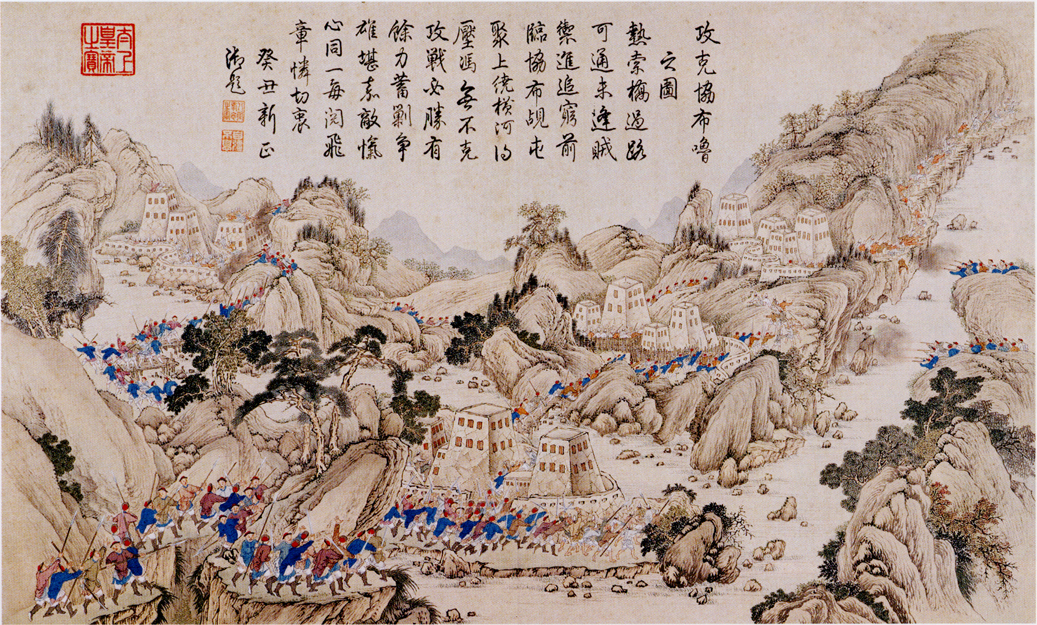
1792 battle as depicted in Chinese painting

The area was the site of a battle during the second campaign of Sino-Nepalese War around 24 July 1792. The village was heavily impacted by the 2026 Nepal–Tibet floods. Over 400 buildings were destroyed and 176 people were reported missing.

== Government ==
The purpose of Village Development Committees is to organise village people structurally at a local level and creating a partnership between the community and the public sector for improved service delivery system. A VDC has a status as an autonomous institution and authority for interacting with the more centralised institutions of governance in Nepal. In doing so, the VDC gives village people an element of control and responsibility in development, and also ensures proper utilization and distribution of state funds and a greater interaction between government officials, NGOs and agencies. The village development committees within a given area will discuss education, water supply, basic health, sanitation and income and will also monitor and record progress which is displayed in census data.

In VDCs there is one elected chief, usually elected with over an 80% majority. From each ward, there is also a chief that is elected along with these there are also four members elected or nominated.
