= Trishuli River =

River in Nepal

Coordinates: 27.7413°N 84.4220°E

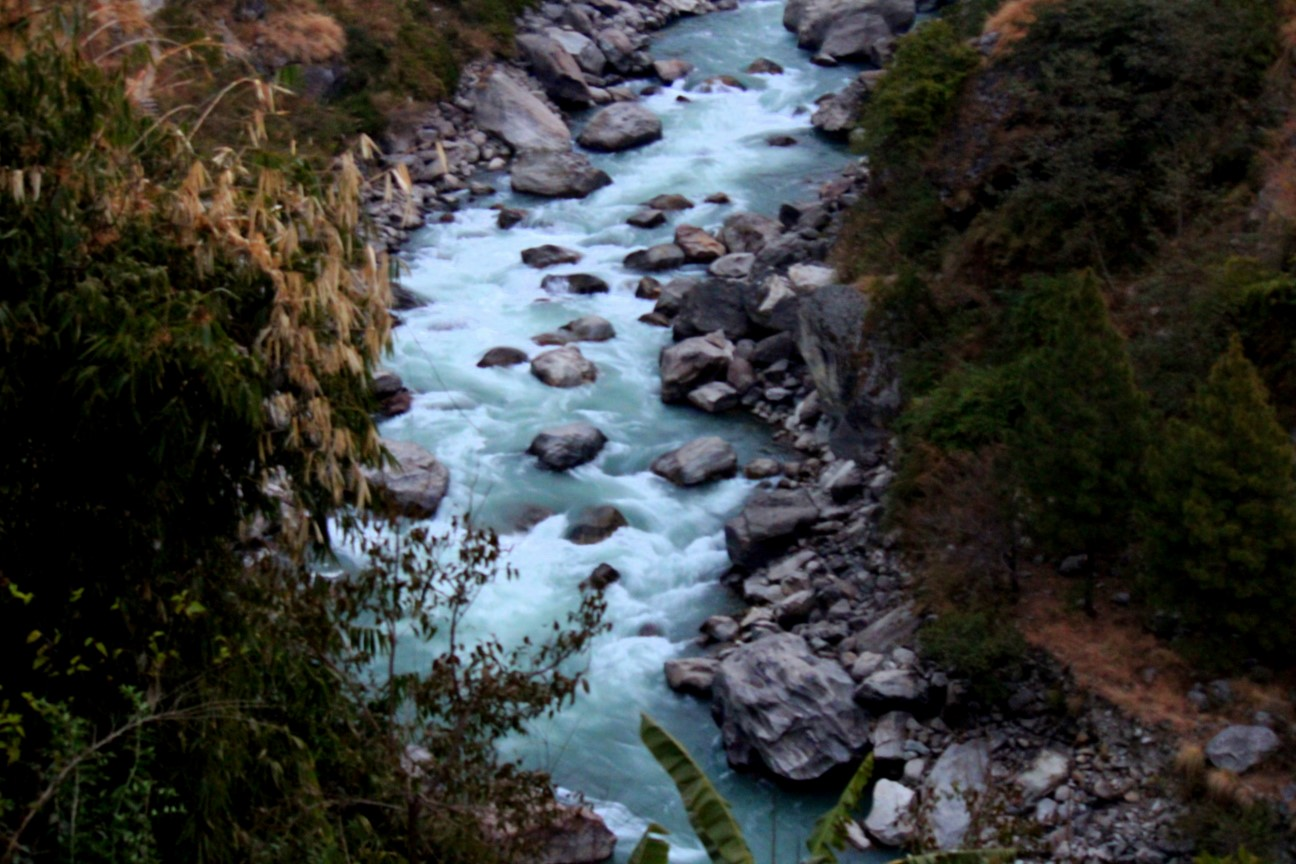
- Trishuli River in Rasuwa

Physical characteristics
- Source
  - location: Gosaikunda, Rasuwa, Nepal
- Mouth
  - location: Narayani River

Basin features
- River system: Narayani River
- Tributaries
  - left: Budhi Gandaki River, Marshyangdi River, Seti Gandaki River
  - right: Zarong-chu

The Trishuli River (Nepali: त्रिशूली नदी) is one of the major tributaries of the Narayani River basin in central Nepal. The river is formed by the merger of the Gyirong Tsangpo (Kerung Khola) and the Lende Khola (Donglin Tsangpo) originating in Gyirong County of Tibet, which join together near the Rasuwa Gadhi on the Nepal–Tibet border. The valley of the river used to be the traditional trade route between the Kathmandu Valley and Tibet.

== Etymology ==
The Trishuli is named after the trishula or trident of Shiva. There is a legend that says high in the Himalayas at Gosaikunda, Shiva drove his trident into the ground to create three springs – which became the source of the Trishuli.

== Course ==
The sources of the Trishuli River lie in the Pekhu Kangri range (called Langtang Himal in Nepal) in Gyirong County in Tibet. Two major rivers, Gyirong Tsangpo (or Kerung Khola) and Lende Khola (or Donglin Tsangpo in Lhasa Tibetan), merge near Rasuwa Fort at the Nepal border to form the Trishuli River. A major tributary Langtang Khola joins near Syaphru (or Syapru Besi). Gyirong Tsangpo has a large basin extending beyond the town of Dzongka and numerous streams forming it: Zarong chu, Gyang chu, Prongda chu, Ublung chu, Tsalung chu, Ragma chu etc. After Ragma, it passes through the alpine "Gyirong Valley" (elevation 2,700 metres (8,900 ft)) with several villages and Gyirong Town. Thereafter, it enters a deep gorge before reaching Rasuwa Fort. This stretch of the river is part of the Nepal–China border.

Lende Khola has two further tributaries originating in Langtang Himal, Richong Chu and Chusumdo Tsangpo, the latter again forming part of the Nepal–China border.

Even though the Trishuli River is physically formed at Rasuwa Fort, at this stage it is referred to officially by the generic name of Bhote Koshi ("The river from Tibet"). It is called Trishuli Ganga after receiving the Trishuli Khola stream originating in Gosainkunda near Dhunche. This would make Gosainkunda the official source of the river, and the river from Tibet a tributary.

The tributaries Tadi Khola and Likhu Khola join the Trishuli near the city of Bidur. The valleys of these rivers provide a connection to Kathmandu via the pass of Badh Bhangyang. These valleys made up the traditional route between Kathmandu and Tibet.

Proceeding further, the Trishuli joins the Narayani River at Devghat. The Narayani flows southwest into India and joins the Ganges, which enters the Bay of Bengal.

== Basin data ==
More than sixty percent of the total drainage basin of the Trishuli lies in Tibet with about nine percent being covered by snow and glaciers. Eighty-five percent of its catchment area of 4,640 square kilometres (1,790 sq mi) lies above 3,000 metres (9,800 ft) out of which eleven percent lies above 6,000 metres (20,000 ft). It has been regularly gauged at Betrawati at an elevation of 600 metres (2,000 ft). The average lowest and the melt season discharges of this river are close to average discharges recorded on the Narayani River.

== Water sports and tourism ==
The Trishuli is Nepal’s most popular rafting river.

The Trishuli valley also proves dangerous to travellers. The curvy Prithvi Highway has led to the death of many Nepalese traveling to or returning from Kathmandu. Every year, several buses and trucks fall and disappear into the river.

== Flooding ==
=== 2025 ===
A severe flash flood on 8 July 2025 caused by outburst of a supraglacial lake in the Tibet region of China left at least nine people dead.

=== 2026 ===
On 26 August 2026, a major flash flood occurred on the river, in particular its upper section at the Tibet border. (Note: The Trishuli River's upper section in Nepal is also known as the Bhotekoshi River, sharing a name with an unrelated Bhotekoshi River 65 km to the east) The flood caused massive damage and loss of life in the Rasuwa and Nuwakot Districts and further downstream. It is considered one of the biggest floods in the region in modern history and exceptionally severe due to its sheer speed and the extensive damage it caused to infrastructure.
