= Trishuli Corridor =

National highway in Nepal

Trishuli Corridor त्रिशुली करिडोर
- राष्ट्रिय राजमार्ग ४२
- National Highway 42
- NH42 shown in red

Route information
- Maintained by MoPIT (Department of Roads)
- Length: 197 km (122 mi)

Major junctions
- North end: Rasuwagadhi–Gyirong Port crossing at the China–Nepal border Connection to G216
- NH01 at Bhandara; NH17 at Malekhu and Galchhi; NH18 at Betrawati and Syaphrubesi
- South end: Thori, near the India–Nepal border

Location
- Country: Nepal
- Provinces: Madhesh Province, Bagmati Province
- Districts: Parsa District, Chitwan District, Dhading District, Nuwakot District, Rasuwa District

Highway system
- Roads in Nepal
← NH41	→ NH43

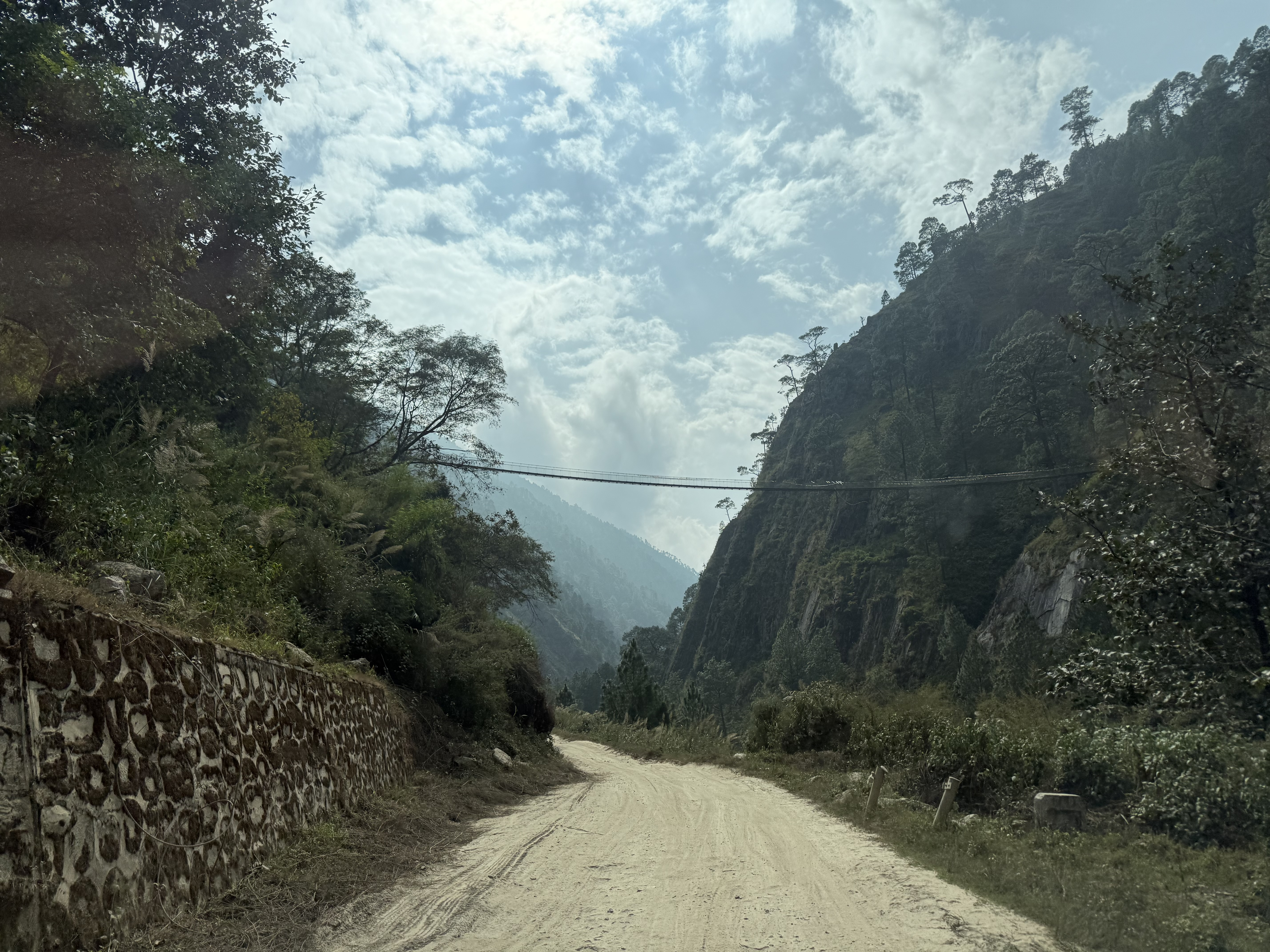
NH42 approaching Syaphrubesi, with a suspension bridge across the upper Trishuli River, locally known as the Bhote Koshi, November 2024

The Trishuli Corridor (National Highway 42, NH42; Nepali: त्रिशुली करिडोर) is a designated north–south national highway in Nepal whose northern section follows the Trishuli River valley. In proposals for a strategic trade route linking Nepal with India and China, it is also referred to as the Kerung–Thori Road.

NH42 comprises two officially listed sections: Thori–Bhandara–Malekhu and Galchhi–Trishuli–Betrawati–Mailung–Syaphrubesi–Rasuwagadhi. The intervening Malekhu–Galchhi road is designated as part of the Prithvi Highway (NH17), rather than NH42. The two NH42 sections have an official combined length of 197 kilometres (122 mi).

The route's southern terminus is at Thori, near the India–Nepal border. Its northern terminus is at Rasuwagadhi on the China–Nepal border, opposite the Gyirong Port land crossing in China's Tibet Autonomous Region. NH42 passes through Madhesh Province and Bagmati Province.

== Route ==
The officially designated southern section is listed as Thori–Bhandara–Malekhu, but it does not form a continuous completed road. The proposed Malekhu–Thori alignment would cross Chitwan National Park, where road development has been opposed because of its potential effects on the park's World Heritage values. In 2025, UNESCO reported that the project remained suspended and that no decision had been taken on its alignment.

North of Bhandara, NH42 follows the Bhandara–Malekhu road, also known as the Chepang Road, through the hills to Malekhu. This road was still incomplete in April 2026, with approximately 13 kilometres (8.1 mi) paved from each end. At Malekhu, NH42 meets the Prithvi Highway (NH17). A through journey continues east for approximately 20.5 kilometres (12.7 mi) along NH17 to Galchhi, where NH42 resumes; the Malekhu–Galchhi connecting section carries only the NH17 designation.

From Galchhi, NH42 follows the Trishuli River valley through the Bidur area and Betrawati. Between Betrawati and Syaphrubesi, NH42 and the Pasang Lhamu Highway (NH18) are separate alternatives rather than a concurrent route. NH42 follows the lower river-valley alignment through Mailung, while NH18 takes the higher route through Dhunche. The highways meet again at Syaphrubesi.

North of Syaphrubesi, NH42 continues along the upper Trishuli River valley through Timure to the Gyirong Port border crossing at Rasuwagadhi. Across the border, the route continues as China National Highway 216 (G216) towards Gyirong (Kerung) in Tibet.

== Development and economic role ==
The Nepal Army opened and handed over the 17 kilometres (11 mi) Mailung–Syaphrubesi track in May 2018. This made the Galchhi–Mailung route to Syaphrubesi approximately 25 kilometres (16 mi) shorter than the alternative through Kalikasthan and Dhunche.

The northern Galchhi–Rasuwagadhi road has been developed as a national-pride project and strategic transport link. It was intended to improve access to China and support the Transit Transport Agreement signed by Nepal and China in 2016. The Rasuwagadhi–Kerung crossing was upgraded to an international border crossing in 2017, allowing travellers from countries other than Nepal and China to use it. The northern section consequently became an important freight route between Kathmandu and China.

== Hazards and flood damage ==
The northern highway occupies a steep river corridor affected by landslides, flooding and riverbank erosion. Damage from flooding in July 2025 narrowed parts of the Syaphrubesi–Rasuwagadhi road to a track approximately 2.5 to 3 metres (8 ft 2 in to 9 ft 10 in) wide. In early 2026, retaining walls were planned at ten critical locations, and cargo vehicles were reported to be travelling under hazardous conditions.

On 26 August 2026, the 2026 Nepal floods caused extensive destruction along the Trishuli River valley. Initial reports from the Department of Roads said the highway had been damaged at multiple points along the 42 kilometres (26 mi) route between Betrawati and Rasuwagadhi, with several concrete bridges swept away. The flood also destroyed the approximately 16 kilometres (9.9 mi) Syaphrubesi–Rasuwagadhi section that was being upgraded with Chinese assistance.

By 29 August, the Department of Roads estimated that approximately 40 kilometres (25 mi) of road between Rasuwagadhi and Malekhu had been damaged and that 41 bridges in the affected area had been destroyed or damaged. The destruction severed road access to the China border and isolated parts of Rasuwa, complicating rescue, relief and freight transport.
