= Jilong (disambiguation) =

Jilong may refer to:

== Mainland China ==
All of the following entries are written as "吉隆":

- Gyirong County, or Jilong County in its pinyin name, Shigatse Prefecture, Tibet AR
  - Gyirong Town, town in Jilong County
  - Gyirong (village), village in Jilong County

== Taiwan ==
- Keelung (基隆市), or Jilong from its pinyin name, a city and major port
- Jilong River or Keelung River
