= Dhunibeshi =

Dhunibeshi Municipality धुनीबेशी नगरपालिका
- Municipality
- Location of Municipality Dhunibeshi Municipality (Nepal)
- Coordinates: 27.43°N 85.09°E
- Country: Nepal
- Province: Bagmati
- District: Dhading
- No. of wards: 9
- Established: 10 March 2017
- Incorporated (VDC): Naubise, Chhatre Dyaurali, Jiwanpur

Government
  - Type: Mayor–council
  - Body: Dhunibeshi Municipality Municipality
  - Mayor: Balkrishna Acharya (CPN (US))
  - Deputy Mayor: Suraj Upreti NC
  - MP & Constituency: Dhading 1
  - MLA & Constituency: Dhading 1(A); Rajendra Prasad Pandey (CPN (US))

Area
  - Total: 96.30 km^{2} (37.18 sq mi)

Population (2011)
  - Total: 31,029
- Time zone: UTC+05:45 (NPT)
- Website: dhunibeshimun.gov.np

Dhunibeshi is a municipality located within the Dhading District of the Bagmati Province of Nepal. The municipality spans 96.30 square kilometres (37.18 sq mi), with a total population of 31,029 according to a 2011 Nepal census.

On March 10, 2017, the Government of Nepal restructured the local level bodies into 753 new local level structures. The previous Naubise, Chhatre Dyaurali and Jiwanpur VDCs were merged to form Dhunibeshi. Dhunibeshi is divided into 9 wards, with Naubise declared the administrative center of the municipality.

== Demographics ==
At the time of the 2011 Nepal census, Dhunibeshi Municipality had a population of 31,029. Of these, 77.1% spoke Nepali, 18.8% Tamang, 2.9% Newar, 0.3% Maithili, 0.2% Bhojpuri, 0.1% English, 0.1% Hindi, 0.1% Magar, 0.1% Tharu, 0.1% Urdu and 0.1% other languages as their first language.

In terms of ethnicity/caste, 28.1% were Tamang, 24.3% Hill Brahmin, 21.3% Chhetri, 6.4% Newar, 4.5% Sarki, 3.0% Magar, 2.9% Rai, 2.1% Kami, 1.6% Damai/Dholi, 1.5% Sanyasi/Dasnami, 0.9% Gharti/Bhujel, 0.7% Danuwar, 0.7% Thakuri, 0.4% Musalman, 0.2% Chepang/Praja, 0.2% Tharu, 0.1% Bhote, 0.1% Gurung, 0.1% Hajam/Thakur, 0.1% Halwai, 0.1% Jirel, 0.1% Kalwar, 0.1% Kathabaniyan, 0.1% Teli, 0.1% Yadav and 0.3% others.

In terms of religion, 81.0% were Hindu, 16.3% Buddhist, 2.1% Christian, 0.4% Muslim, 0.1% Prakriti and 0.1% others.
