= Tribhuvan Highway =

Highway in Nepal

Tribhuwan Highway त्रिभुवन राजपथ
- राष्ट्रिय राजमार्ग ४१
- National Highway 41
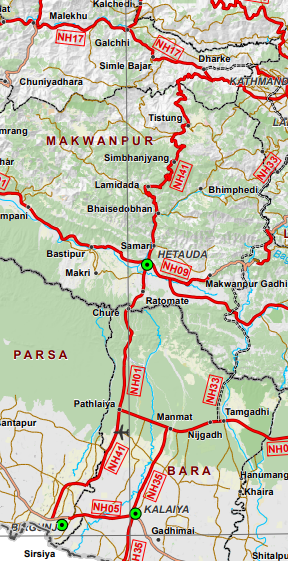
- NH41 Tribhuvan Highway Map NH41 in Map

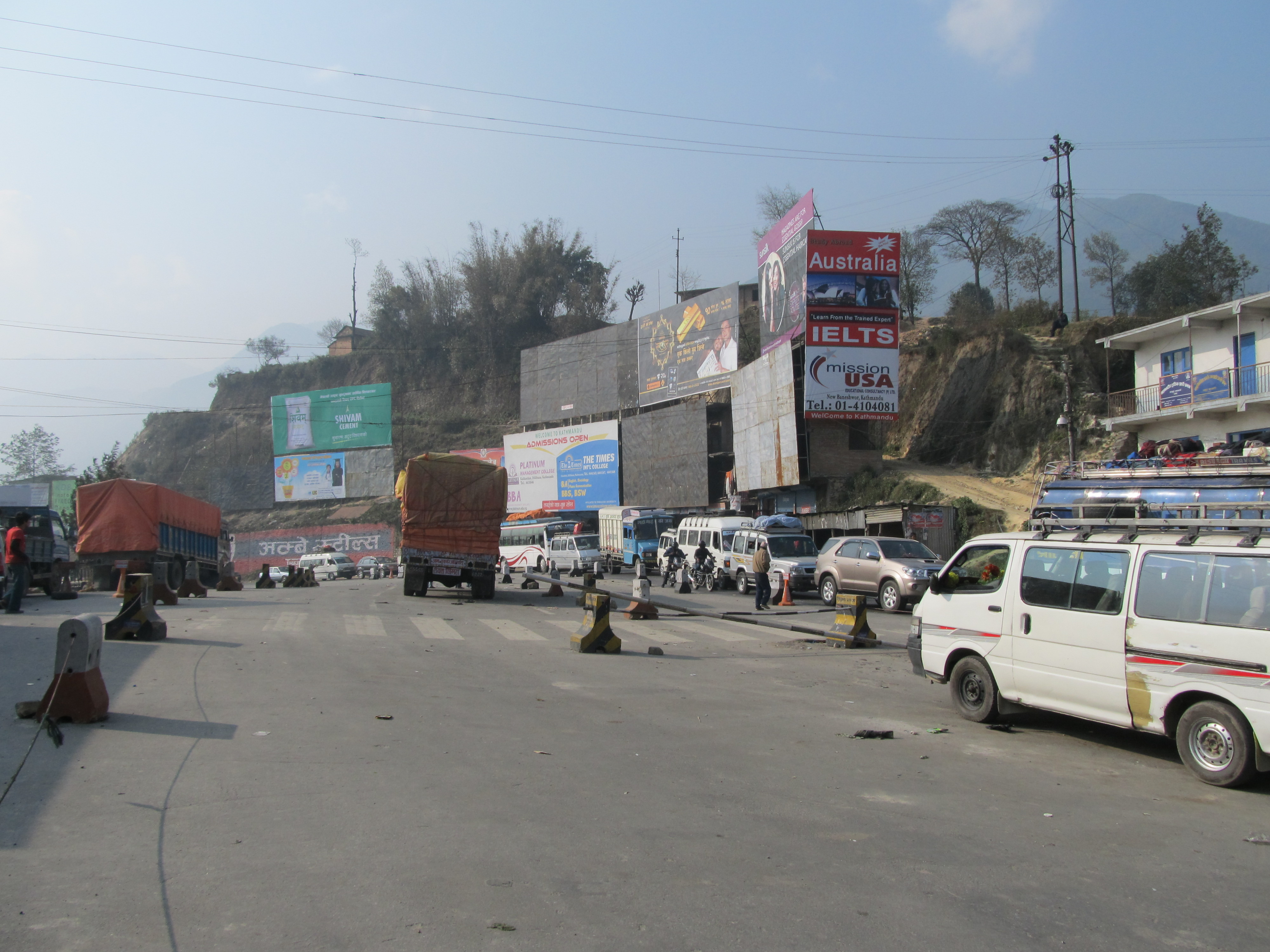

Route information
- Part of AH42
- Maintained by MoPIT (Department of Roads)
- Length: 155 km (96 mi)

Major junctions
- From: Tripureshwor, Kathmandu, Nepal
- To: Integrated Check Post, Sirisiya, Nepal

Location
- Country: Nepal

Highway system
- Roads in Nepal
← NH40	→ NH42

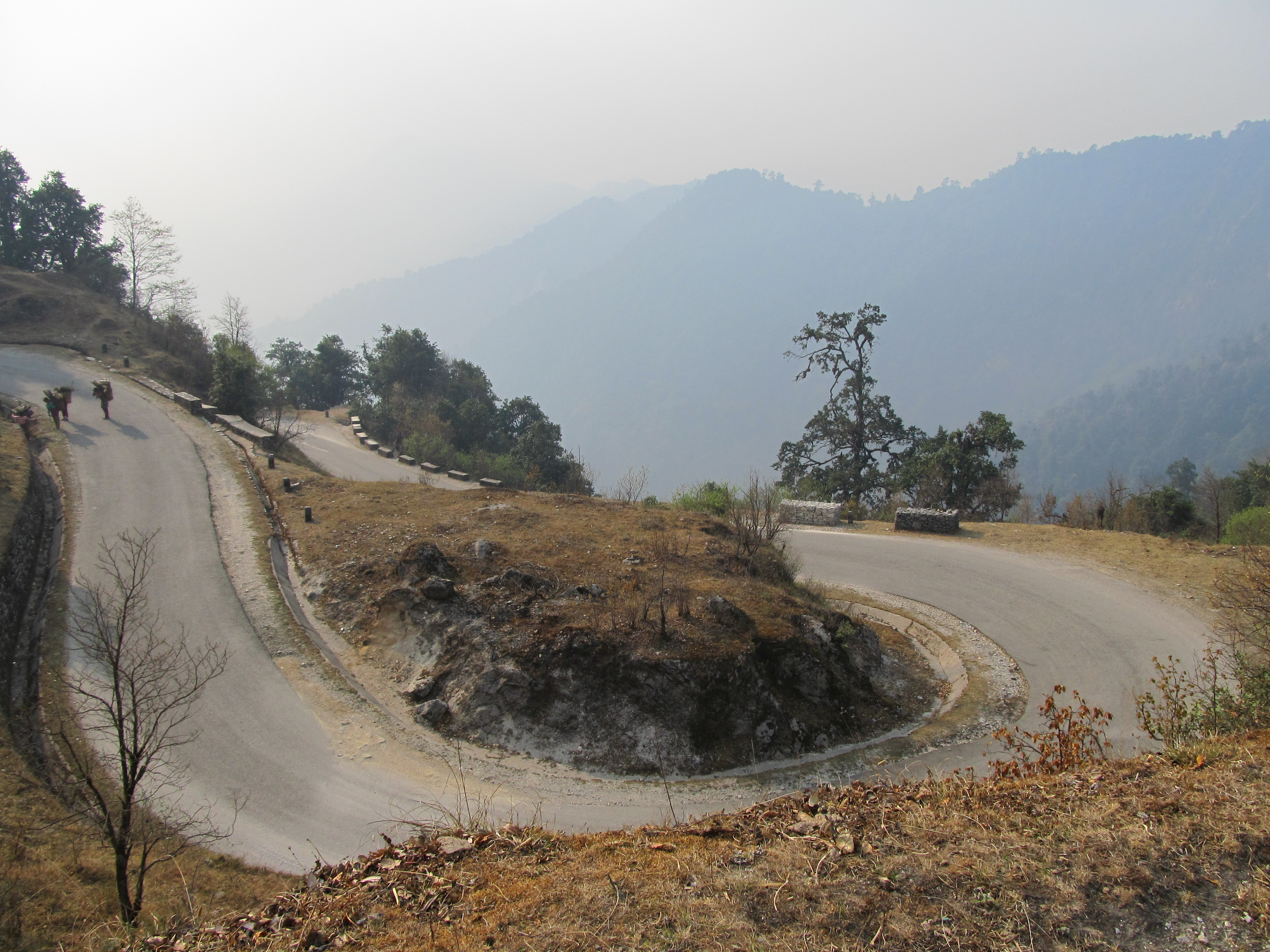
Another view of the highway

The Tribhuvan Highway or NH 41 connects the outskirts of Kathmandu, the capital of Nepal, with the Sirsiya Integrated Check Post (ICP) in Birgunj on the Nepal-India border.

== History ==
Known informally as Byroad, the Tribhuvan Highway is the oldest and the first highway of Nepal and links Naubise, 25 kilometres (16 mi) west of Kathmandu with the Indian border at Birgunj/Raxaul. It was named in memory of King Tribhuvan (1906–1955).

Its construction was completed with Indian assistance in 1956, and became the first serviceable road connection with India. The first regular daily bus service on the highway was operated by Nepal Transport Service in 1959. The bus route ended at the railway station at Amlekhganj, from where travellers took the Nepal Government Railway (NGR) the rest of the way to Birgunj and Raxaul.

Before Tribhuvan Highway was built, travelers used the historic trade route passing through Kulekhani, Chitlang, Chandragiri Pass and Thankot.

== 2015 alignment modification ==
In 2015, the Government of Nepal approved a modification of the Tribhuvan Highway (NH41) previous (H02) alignment in the Pathlaiya–Birgunj section. The revised alignment changed the previously approved route and connected the highway through the Pathlaiya–Parwanipur intersection to the Sirsiya Integrated Check Post (ICP). The decision was adopted to improve connectivity with Nepal's principal freight and customs gateway at Birgunj.

== Route ==
The best stretch of the highway is through the Terai region. Thereafter, it is an unending series of climbs and descents through the Sivalik Hills north of Hetauda. Its total length extends to some 116 kilometres (72 mi) from north to south. It is 32 kilometres (20 mi) as the crow flies from Hetauda to Naubise, but Tribhuvan Highway makes it an astonishing 107 kilometres (66 mi). At Naubise, the Tribhuwan Highway intersects the Prithvi Highway.

Daman on Tribhuvan Highway has probably the finest view of the Himalayas extending on a good day from Dhaulagiri in the west to Everest in the east.

Pathlaiya is the junction point of the Mahendra Highway and the Tribhuvan Highway.

Historically, the highway continued directly into the Birgunj city center. However, to accommodate increasing commercial traffic and urban growth, the Government of Nepal (Ministry of Physical Infrastructure and Transport) officially changed the alignment of the Pathlaiya–Birgunj section. The highway now routes from Pathlaiya through the Parwanipur intersection, terminating at the Sirsiya Integrated Check Post (ICP). Ministry of Physical Infrastructure and Transport, Government of Nepal. "Decision regarding the change in the historical alignment of the Pathlaiya-Birgunj section." Proposal approved 2072/05/20 BS (2015), Implementation directive issued 2080/03/18 BS (2023).

== Kathmandu-Terai Expressway alternative ==
There are at least half a dozen routes to the Terai region via Makawanpur from the capital city, including Tribhuvan Highway, Kanti Highway, Ganesh Man Road, and Madan Bhandari Road. The four-lane fast track extending from the outer ring road in Kathmandu to Nijgadh in the Terai region will be the shortest and will only be 76 kilometres (47 mi). The track will have a tunnel of 1.3 km at Thingana of Makawanpur. It has been under construction since 2008.
