= China National Highway 216 =

National highway in Xinjiang and Tibet, China

National Highway 216
- 216国道

Route information
- Part of AH4
- Length: 3,526 km (2,191 mi)

Major junctions
- North end: Hongshanzui Port, Fuhai County, Xinjiang (Mongolia) A15
- G217 / G331 at Altay; G312 / G314 at Ürümqi; G218 at Baluntai and Korla; G314 at Korla and Luntai; G315 at Minfeng; G349 at Saga; G219 at Saga and Gyirong
- South end: Gyirong Port, Gyirong County, Tibet (Nepal) NH42

Location
- Country: China

Highway system
- National Trunk Highway System; Primary; Auxiliary
← G215	→ G217

China National Highway 216 (G216; Chinese: 216国道; pinyin: 216 Guódào), officially the Hongshanzui–Gyirong Highway (红山嘴－吉隆公路), is a north–south national highway in western China. It runs from Hongshanzui Port on the China–Mongolia border in Fuhai County, Xinjiang, through Xinjiang and the western Tibetan Plateau to Gyirong Port on the China–Nepal border in Gyirong County, Tibet.

The official route kilometrage reaches K3525+850 at the Gyirong border gate, giving a route length of approximately 3,526 km (2,191 mi). At its northern terminus, G216 connects with Mongolia's A15, the Ölgii–Dayan–national border road. At Gyirong Port, it connects across the border at Rasuwagadhi with Nepal's National Highway 42 (NH42).

Before the expansion of China's national-highway network in 2013, G216 was confined to Xinjiang, running from Altay City to Baluntai in Hejing County. That former route was 857 km (533 mi) long. The 857 km figure therefore applies to the former Altay–Baluntai alignment, not to the present cross-regional highway.

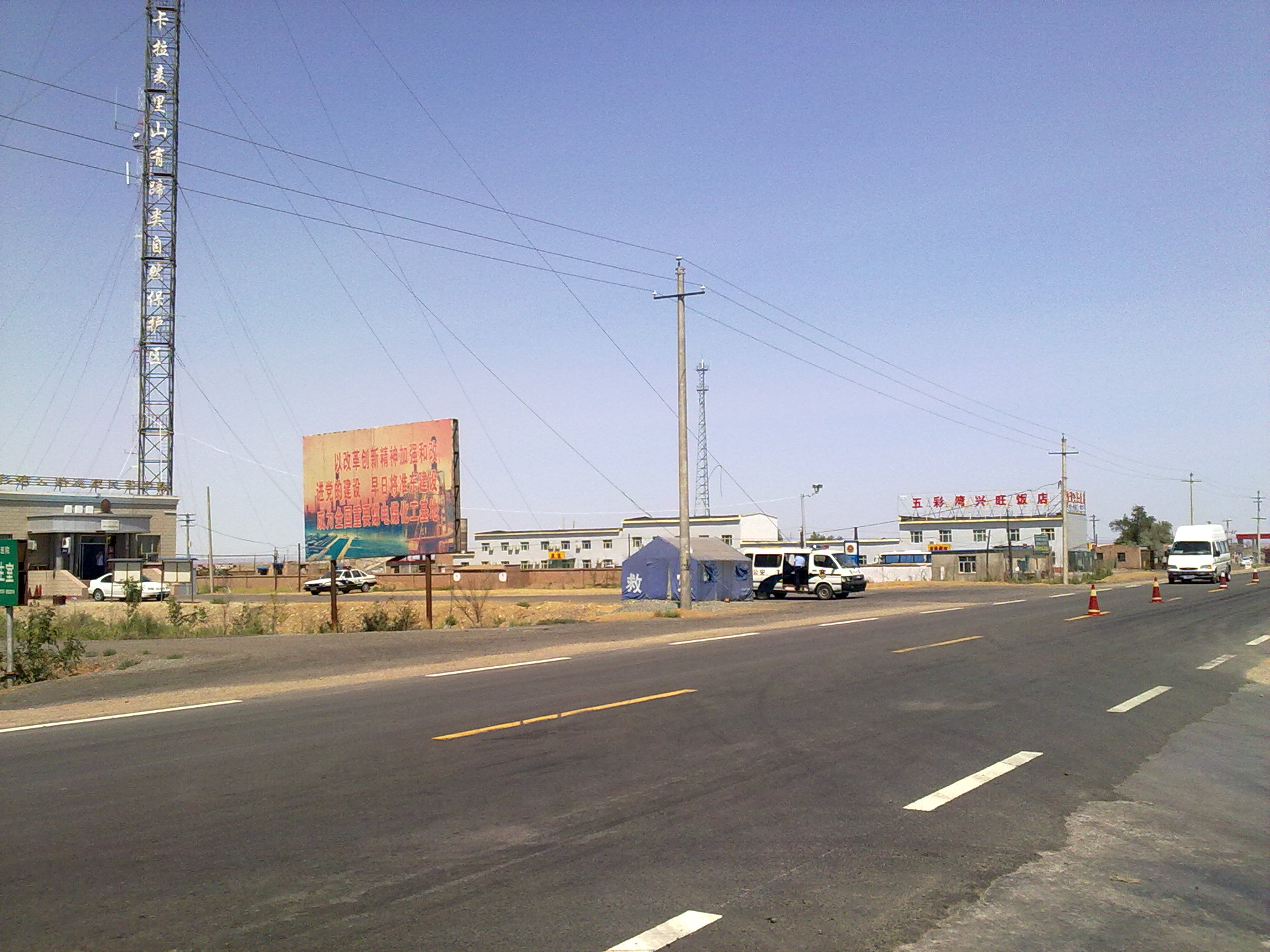
G216 at Wucaiwan in the Junggar Basin, Xinjiang, in 2010

== Route ==
The 2022 National Highway Network Plan lists the principal control points of G216 as Hongshanzui Port, Altay, Fukang, Ürümqi, Baluntai, Korla, Luntai, Minfeng, Gêrzê, Coqên, Saga and Gyirong Port.

Within Xinjiang, the regional government's 2018–2030 comprehensive transport strategy assigns 2,111 km of the planned G216 to the autonomous region. It identifies Hongshanzui Port, Altay, Fukang, Ürümqi, Baluntai, Korla, Luntai and Minfeng as the principal control points within Xinjiang.

The highway intersects or shares corridors with several other national highways. At Altay it meets G217 and G331. In and around Ürümqi it connects with G312 and G314. G218 also passes through Baluntai and Korla, while G314 passes through Korla and Luntai. At Minfeng, G216 meets G315. In Tibet, G216 reaches Saga, the western terminus of G349, and shares Saga and Gyirong as control points with G219.

A section of G216 also forms part of Asian Highway 4. The United Nations Economic and Social Commission for Asia and the Pacific identifies the 436.9 km section between Fuyun and Ürümqi as part of AH4.

== Route and distance ==
The extension and realignment of G216 after 2013 changed the route's kilometre system. The distances formerly used for the Altay–Baluntai highway therefore cannot be applied directly to the present route. Current route kilometre posts are shown below where they are documented by road-authority sources; the former kilometre figures are retained separately for historical comparison.

Location	Region	Current route kilometrage	Pre-2013 distance from Altay (km)	Connections
Hongshanzui Port	Xinjiang	0	—	(Mongolia) A15
Altay	Xinjiang	—	0	G217, G331
Fukang	Xinjiang	—	600	
Miquan/Midong	Xinjiang	—	644	
Ürümqi	Xinjiang	—	662	G312, G314
Baluntai	Xinjiang	—	857	G218
Korla	Xinjiang	—	—	G218, G314
Luntai	Xinjiang	—	—	G314
Minfeng	Xinjiang	—	—	G315
Gêrzê	Tibet	—	—	
Coqên	Tibet	—	—	
Saga	Tibet	—	—	G219, G349
Gyirong Town	Tibet	3500.2	—	G219
Gyirong Port	Tibet	3525.85	—	(Nepal) NH42

The pre-2013 intermediate distances in the table are from the former Altay-based kilometre system. The former route's overall length of 857 km is independently documented by a Chinese provincial transport authority. The present kilometre posts at Gyirong Town and Gyirong Port are given by the Tibet Autonomous Region's transport authority.

== History ==
=== Former Altay–Baluntai route ===
Before 2013, G216 ran entirely within Xinjiang. It began at Altay City and ran south through northern Xinjiang, Fukang and Ürümqi, crossed the Tian Shan, and ended at Baluntai in Hejing County, where it met G218.

The former highway was 857 km long. Under its former kilometre system, Altay was kilometre zero, Fukang was at approximately kilometre 600, Miquan at 644, Ürümqi at 662 and Baluntai at 857. Miquan ceased to exist as a separate county-level city in 2007 when it was merged with Ürümqi's Dongshan District to form Midong District.

Parts of the old G216 were subsequently rebuilt or bypassed by higher-standard roads, but portions of the older alignment remain in use as part of the modern G216 corridor.

=== 2013 extension ===
China's National Highway Network Plan for 2013–2030, approved in 2013, substantially expanded the ordinary national-highway network.

Under the plan, G216 was extended north from Altay to Hongshanzui Port on the Mongolian border and south from Baluntai through Korla, Luntai, Minfeng, western Tibet and Gyirong to the Nepalese border. Xinjiang government project documents subsequently described the expanded G216 as part of the Hongshanzui–Gyirong national-highway corridor.

The 2022 National Highway Network Plan retained the Hongshanzui–Gyirong designation and the same principal control points.

=== Hongshanzui–Altay ===
The northern extension links Altay with Hongshanzui Port on the China–Mongolia border. On the Mongolian side, the route continues as A15 through Dayan toward Ölgii. Mongolia's official road-maintenance classification lists A15 as the 185 km Ölgii–Dayan–national border road.

Construction of the Chinese section continued after the 2013 designation. The G216 Hongshanzui Port–Altay road was one of six major national and provincial trunk-road projects opened in Xinjiang on 30 June 2025. The Xinjiang transport department described the new road as strengthening the connection between the Mongolian border crossing and the Altay region.

=== Xinjiang–Tibet section ===
South of Minfeng, the expanded G216 crosses a sparsely populated high-altitude region between southern Xinjiang and western Tibet. This created a second major road corridor between Xinjiang and Tibet in addition to G219.

Construction was carried out in stages. In its 2017 government work report, Gêrzê County described the new Minfeng–Gêrzê section as a 727 km third-class highway project.

The route continues across the high-altitude interior through Gêrzê and Coqên to Saga. G216 then runs south towards Gyirong, where it intersects the extended G219 corridor. G349, whose official western terminus is Saga, also meets the G216/G219 network there.

== Gyirong and the Nepal border ==
The southernmost part of G216 descends from the Tibetan Plateau through Gyirong County towards Gyirong Port and the border with Nepal. The road reaches the international boundary at the Resuo Bridge/Rasuwagadhi crossing.

The April 2015 Nepal earthquake seriously damaged roads and border infrastructure in southern Tibet. Zhangmu Port suspended operations following the earthquake, while major reconstruction works were carried out on G216 between Gyirong County and the border.

The Gyirong County–Resuo Bridge section is 94.38 km long. A 2017 Tibet government report identified 23 geological-hazard sites along this section, an average of approximately one hazard site every four kilometres. During the period in which Zhangmu remained closed, the Tibet government described G216 through Gyirong as the only functioning land-port road connecting Tibet with Nepal.

The Gyirong–Rasuwa crossing was expanded into an international road port open to travellers from third countries in August 2017.

On the Nepalese side, the highway connects at Rasuwagadhi with NH42. Nepal's Department of Roads defines NH42 as the route comprising the Thori–Bhandara–Malekhu and Galchhi–Trishuli–Betrawati–Mailung–Syaphrubesi–Rasuwagadhi corridors.

=== Floods and landslides near Gyirong ===
The southern section between Gyirong Town and the Nepalese border crosses steep and geologically unstable Himalayan terrain and has repeatedly been affected by landslides, debris flows and flooding.

On 28 September 2024, multiple debris flows and landslides damaged G216 between approximately K3500 and K3525, from Gyirong Town towards Resuo Bridge. Emergency work allowed one-way traffic to resume on 29 October, but scheduled traffic controls remained in force into 2025.

Repair work continued during 2025. On 8 July 2025, flooding of the Donglin Zangbo and an associated debris flow damaged a pier of the Resuo Bridge on G216, causing part of the bridge to collapse and again interrupting traffic.

On 26 August 2026, a major debris flow originating on the Nepalese side of the border struck the Gyirong Port area during the 2026 Nepal floods. The Tibet Autonomous Region Department of Transport imposed two-way traffic controls on G216 from K3500+200 at Gyirong Town to K3525+850 at the border gate.

The disaster washed away or blocked sections of the highway and initially prevented heavy machinery from reaching the worst-affected parts of the Chinese side of the border area. Reuters described G216 as the only road serving the Gyirong border crossing and reported that equipment and supplies initially had to be brought into the disaster area by air while road crews worked to restore access.

An emergency road connection was restored by 2 September, enabling rescuers and heavy machinery to reach the principal disaster zone. The restoration of emergency access did not immediately constitute unrestricted reopening of the highway: on 3 September, the Tibet transport department continued to list the entire Gyirong Town–border gate section under two-way traffic control, with no date announced for lifting the restriction.

== See also ==
- China National Highways
- China National Highway 219
- Asian Highway 4
- Gyirong Port
- Trishuli Corridor
