= Kathmandu Outer Ring Road =

Highway in Nepal

Kathmandu Outer Ring Road काठमाडाैँ बाहिरी चक्रपथ
- राष्ट्रिय राजमार्ग ३८
- National Highway 38
- NH38 in red
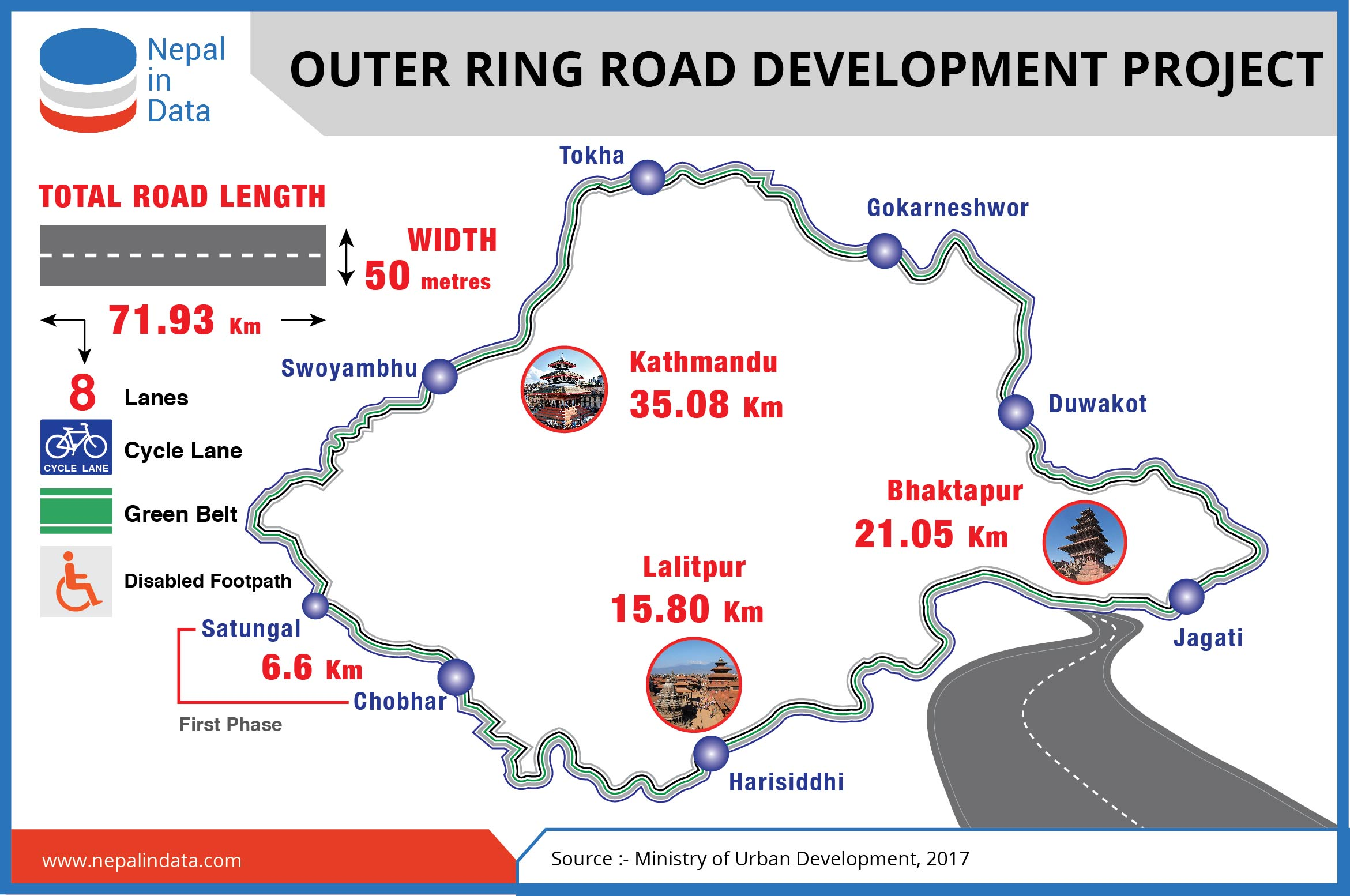
- Proposed ring road

Route information
- Maintained by MoPIT (Department of Roads)
- Length: 71.93 km (44.70 mi)
- History: Proposed

Location
- Country: Nepal
- Provinces: Bagmati Province
- Districts: Kathmandu, Bhaktapur, Lalitapur

Highway system
- Roads in Nepal
← NH37	→ NH39

Kathmandu Outer Ring Road (National Highway 38, NH38) is a proposed ring road to be constructed in the Kathmandu Valley, categorised as a national highway. It will be constructed on the outer side of the existing ring road (NH39). It will pass through three districts of Bagmati Province: Kathmandu, Bhaktapur and Lalitpur. The total length of the highway is supposed to be 71.93 kilometres (44.70 mi).

The concept of constructing a 72-kilometre (45 mi) outer ring road circling the three districts—Kathmandu, Lalitpur and Bhaktapur—was introduced in the year 2058 BS (2001 AD). The outer ring road will cover a length of 35.08 kilometres (21.80 mi) in Kathmandu, 15.80 kilometres (9.82 mi) in Lalitpur and 21.05 kilometres (13.08 mi) in Bhaktapur. The highway will be eight-lane road 50 metres (160 ft) wide (with a 6-metre (20 ft) setback on either side), cycle tracks, greenbelts and pavements on both the sides, along with flyovers at major junctions.
