= National Highway 40 (Nepal) =

Highway in Nepal

Thanapati-Samakhushi Highway थानापति-सामाखुशी राजमार्ग
- राष्ट्रिय राजमार्ग ४०
- National Highway 40
- NH40 in red

Route information
- Maintained by MoPIT (Department of Roads)
- Length: 29.52 km (18.34 mi)

Major junctions
- North end: Thanapati
- Sourh end: Samakhushi

Location
- Country: Nepal
- Provinces: Bagmati Province
- Districts: Kathmandu, Nuwakot

Highway system
- Roads in Nepal
← NH39	→ NH41

National Highway NH40 (Thanapati-Samakhushi) is a national highway of Nepal. The highway is located in Kathmandu District and Nuwakot District of Bagmati Province. The total length of the highway is 29.52 kilometres (18.34 mi).

The Highway was proposed to construct 54.80 kilometres (34.05 mi) as a Feeder road (F082) from Samakhushi to Gangate but later plan changed and took decision to convert 29.52 kilometres (18.34 mi) of the road from Samakhushi to Thanagau as National Highway 40. The government gave a contract to upgrade and develop the Feeder road F082 (from Samakhusi to Thanagau 29.52 kilometres (18.34 mi)) plus (Thanagau to Chhahare 4.62 kilometres (2.87 mi)) total 34.2 kilometres (21.3 mi). The project was envisioned to increase trade between Kerung bazaar and China through Rasuwa and Nuwakot
