= Lake Pelku =

Lake of Tibet, China

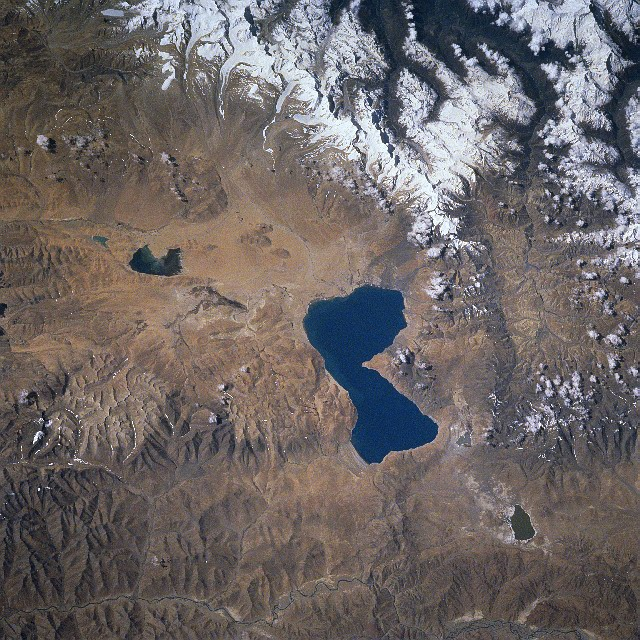
- From space, May 1997. North is down.

- Location within Ngari
- Location: Tibet Autonomous Region; Shigatse Prefecture; Gyirong County and Nyalam County
- Coordinates: 28°55′N 85°35′E
- Type: brackish
- Primary outflows: None (endorheic).
- Max. length: 27 km (17 mi)
- Surface elevation: 4,591 m (15,062 ft)

Lake Pelku (Tibetan: དཔལ་ཁུད་མཚོ, Wylie: dpal khud mtsho, THL: pel khü tso), Pelkhu, or Paiku (Chinese: 佩枯错; pinyin: Pèikū Cuò) (Note: KNAB database lists an alternative form of the Tibean name: Tibetan: པད་ཁུད་མཚོ, Wylie: pad khud mtsho, THL: pé khü tso. Alternative English spellings are: Peiku, Pelgu, Palgu etc.) is a lake at 4,591 meters (15,062 ft) elevation on the Tibetan Plateau in Shigatse Prefecture. It is 18 kilometers (11 mi) south of the Yarlung Tsangpo (Brahmaputra) River, bordering Saga County, Gyirong County, and Nyalam County.

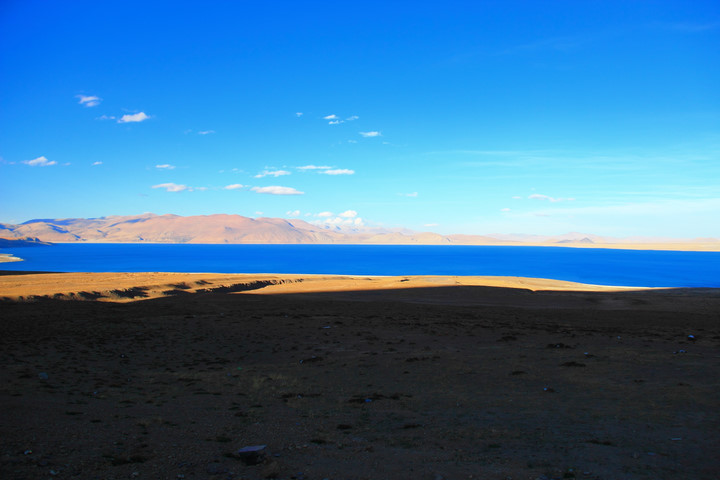
Lake Paiku in Tibet

The lake is 27 kilometers (17 mi) long and 6 kilometers (3.7 mi) wide at its narrowest. It is surrounded by mountains reaching 5,700 to 6,000 meters (18,700 to 19,700 ft). Streams fed by glaciers cascade to the valley floor, but most sink into alluvial deposits before reaching the lake.

The surrounding catchment is an endorheic basin with no outlet. It would overflow into the Yarlung Tsangpo with a water level about 100 meters (330 ft) higher. The lake's brackish water is evidence that it has not overflowed in hundreds, if not thousands, of years.

== Climate ==
Climate data for Lake Pelku
Month	Jan	Feb	Mar	Apr	May	Jun	Jul	Aug	Sep	Oct	Nov	Dec	Year
Mean daily maximum °C (°F)	−0.2 (31.6)	0.6 (33.1)	3.6 (38.5)	7.6 (45.7)	10.7 (51.3)	13.6 (56.5)	12.8 (55.0)	12.3 (54.1)	11.2 (52.2)	7.9 (46.2)	3.3 (37.9)	1.4 (34.5)	7.1 (44.7)
Daily mean °C (°F)	−8.1 (17.4)	−7.0 (19.4)	−3.6 (25.5)	0.0 (32.0)	3.3 (37.9)	7.1 (44.8)	7.7 (45.9)	7.3 (45.1)	5.5 (41.9)	0.8 (33.4)	−4.2 (24.4)	−6.5 (20.3)	0.2 (32.3)
Mean daily minimum °C (°F)	−15.9 (3.4)	−14.6 (5.7)	−10.8 (12.6)	−7.5 (18.5)	−4.0 (24.8)	0.6 (33.1)	2.7 (36.9)	2.3 (36.1)	−0.1 (31.8)	−6.2 (20.8)	−11.7 (10.9)	−14.3 (6.3)	−6.6 (20.1)
Average precipitation mm (inches)	12 (0.5)	9 (0.4)	13 (0.5)	10 (0.4)	7 (0.3)	25 (1.0)	81 (3.2)	86 (3.4)	34 (1.3)	16 (0.6)	1 (0.0)	4 (0.2)	298 (11.8)
Source: Climate-Data.org

== Bibliography ==
- National Aeronautics and Space Administration
- Chan, Victor (1994), Tibet Handbook, Moon Publications – via archive.org
- Dorje, Gyurme (2004), Footprint Tibet Handbook with Bhutan (3rd ed.), Bath: Footprint Handbooks, ISBN 1-903471-30-3 – via archive.org
