= Drakna Township =

Township in Tibet region of China

Coordinates: 29°10′52″N 85°53′02″E

Drakna, (Note: Tibetan: བྲག་སྣ, Wylie: brag sna, THL: drak na) Drakne, (Note: Tibetan: བྲག་སྣེ, Wylie: brag sne, THL: drak né) or Chagnê (Note: Chinese: 差那; pinyin: Chà nà) is a township in Gyirong County, Tibet Autonomous Region of China.

Drakna is a farming village on the bank of Maquan River at an elevation of 4,420 metres (14,500 ft). In addition to Drakna, the township has five other villages: Nailong Village, Gampo Village, Kongmu Village, Tangguo Village, and Karon Village.

== See also ==
- List of towns and villages in Tibet
