= New Road of Kathmandu =

High street and financial hub of Kathmandu, Nepal

New Road
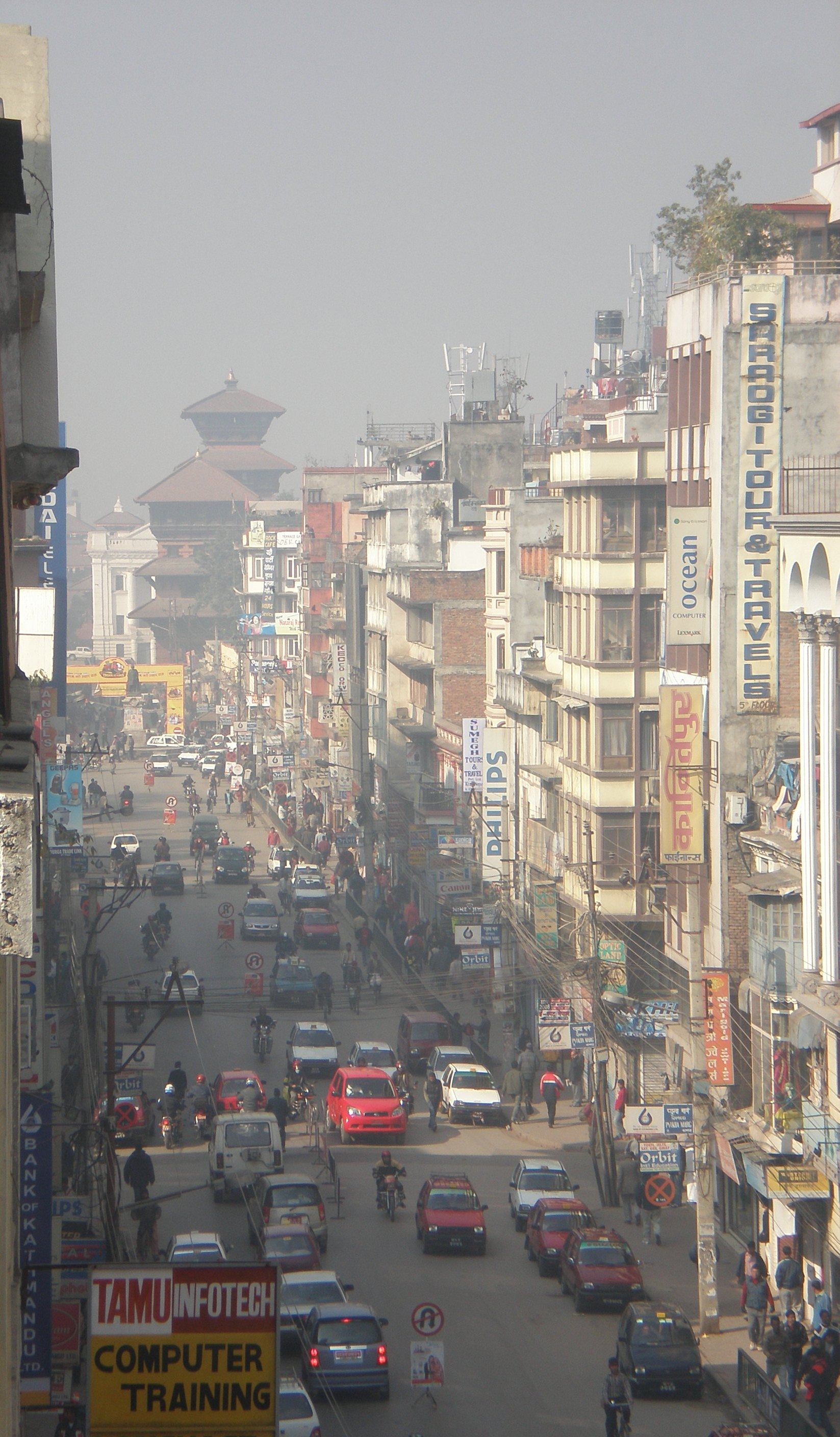
- Interactive map of New Road
- Native name: नयाँ सडक (Nepali); न्हु सडक (Newar)
- Former name: Juddha Sadak
- East: Tundikhel
- West: Basantapur

Construction
- Inauguration: 1934

New Road is the financial hub and a busy High Street in Kathmandu, Nepal. It refers to a two lane street in the center of Kathmandu, as well as the surrounding neighborhood. It is one of the busiest marketplaces in the city. Being near the midpoint of the ring road in Kathmandu, as well as the old center of Kathmandu (Kathmandu Durbar Square, also known as Basantapur, Kathmandu), it is one of the central locations in the city.

== History ==
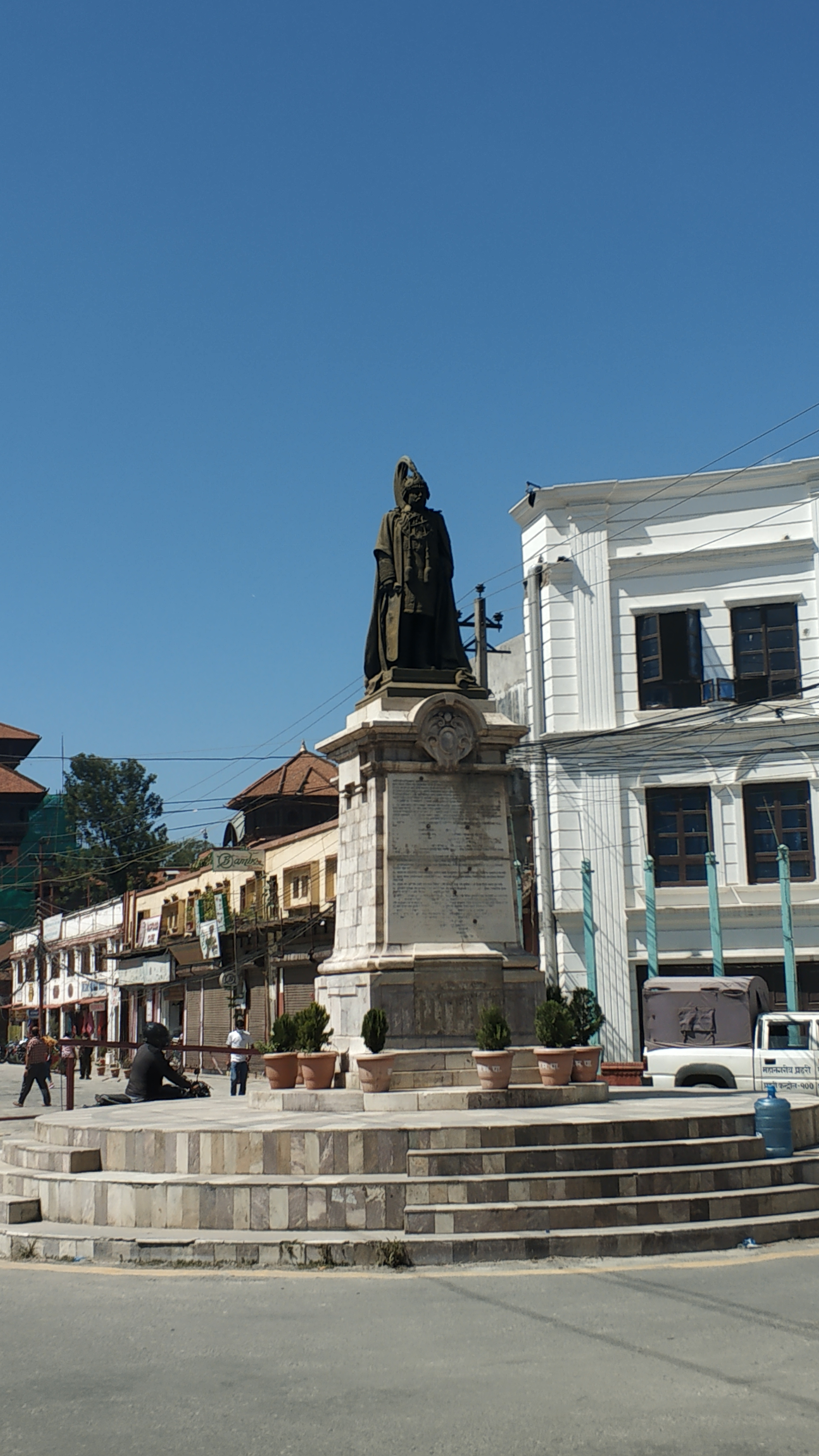
Juddha Shumsher Jang Bahadur Rana's statue at Newroad, Kathmandu.

The road was built during the period of prime ministership Juddha Shumsher Jung Bahadur Rana after the 1934 Nepal–India earthquake destroyed many buildings in the Kathmandu Valley. It was formally called Juddha Sadak in his honor. The road can also be referred as old Kings Way of Nepal, as the road leads to old royal palace of Royal Families, Kathmandu Durbar Square which is a UNESCO World Heritage Site. The inhabitants of New Road are mostly Newars.After the fall of autocratic Rana regime, it was renamed New Road.

== Notable buildings and areas ==
The headquarters of Nepal Airlines is located on the Eastern end of New Road, next to New Road Gate, which marks the start of New Road at the crossing with Kantipath. A statue of Juddha Shumsher Jung Bahadur Rana is located at the westernmost roundabout of the road Head offices of Gorkhapatra Sansthan and Nepal Bank Limited are also located at New Road. Bhughol Park is located on the southwestern corner of the street.

Notable places include:

1. Kathmandu Durbar Square: Also known as Hanuman Dhoka. This historic palace is located at the southern end of New Road, served as the royal residence of the Malla kings from the 14th to the 17th centuries. Its intricate architecture and historical significance make it a popular tourist destination. It is also a UNESCO World Heritage Site. The square is home to numerous temples, palaces, and courtyards, offering a glimpse into Nepal's rich cultural heritage.
2. Ason Tole: Located just off New Road, Ason Tole is one of the oldest and busiest marketplaces in Kathmandu. The maze-like alleyways have vendors selling everything from spices and textiles to souvenirs and traditional handicrafts.
3. Indra Chowk: This bustling intersection marks the heart of New Road, where the hustle and bustle of the commercial district reaches its peak. The area is known for its electronics shops, jewelry stores, and traditional Tibetan handicrafts.
4. Freak Street (Jonchhe): Once a haven for hippies and backpackers in the 1960s and 1970s, Freak Street has retained a bohemian charm with its eclectic mix of restaurants, bars, and shops.
