= Baluntai =

Baluntai بالغۇنتاي بازىرى 巴仑台镇 ᠪᠠᠯᠭᠠᠨᠲᠠᠢ ᠪᠠᠯᠭᠠᠰᠤ
- Town
- Location in Xinjiang
- Coordinates: 42°45′34″N 86°19′23″E
- Country: China
- Province: Xinjiang
- Prefecture: Bayingolin Mongol Autonomous Prefecture
- County: Hejing County

Area
  - Total: 3,020 km^{2} (1,170 sq mi)
- Elevation: 1,751 m (5,745 ft)

Population (2008)
  - Total: 10,521
  - Density: 3.48/km^{2} (9.02/sq mi)
- Postal code: 652827

Baluntai (simplified Chinese: 巴仑台; traditional Chinese: 巴崙台; pinyin: Bālúntái) is a town in north-central Xinjiang Uyghur Autonomous Region of Northwest China. It is located in the mountainous area 60 kilometres (37 mi) north of Hejing Town (和静镇), the seat of Hejing County, which administers it. It borders Ke'erguti Township (克尔古提乡) on the east, Bayinbulak on the west, and Ürümqi Prefecture on the north.

Baluntai's total area is 3,020 km^{2}, with 123,600 mu (82.4 km^{2}) of forest and 3.2 million mu (2133 1/3 km^{2}) of pasture. It had a population of 10,521 in 2008, among which more than 75% are Mongols. Economy of Baluntai is supported by livestock breeding and tourism.

== Transport ==
Baluntai is served by China National Highways 216 and 218, and the Southern Xinjiang Railway.

== Sights ==
- Huang Temple (aka Yong'an Temple), one of the sacred places and prestigious Lama temples for Gelug school of Buddhism, is located in Baluntai.
