= Ring Road (Kathmandu) =

Ring road in Nepal

Kathmandu Ring Road काठमाडाैँ चक्रपथ
- राष्ट्रिय राजमार्ग ३९
- National Highway 39
- Kathmandu Ring Road in red
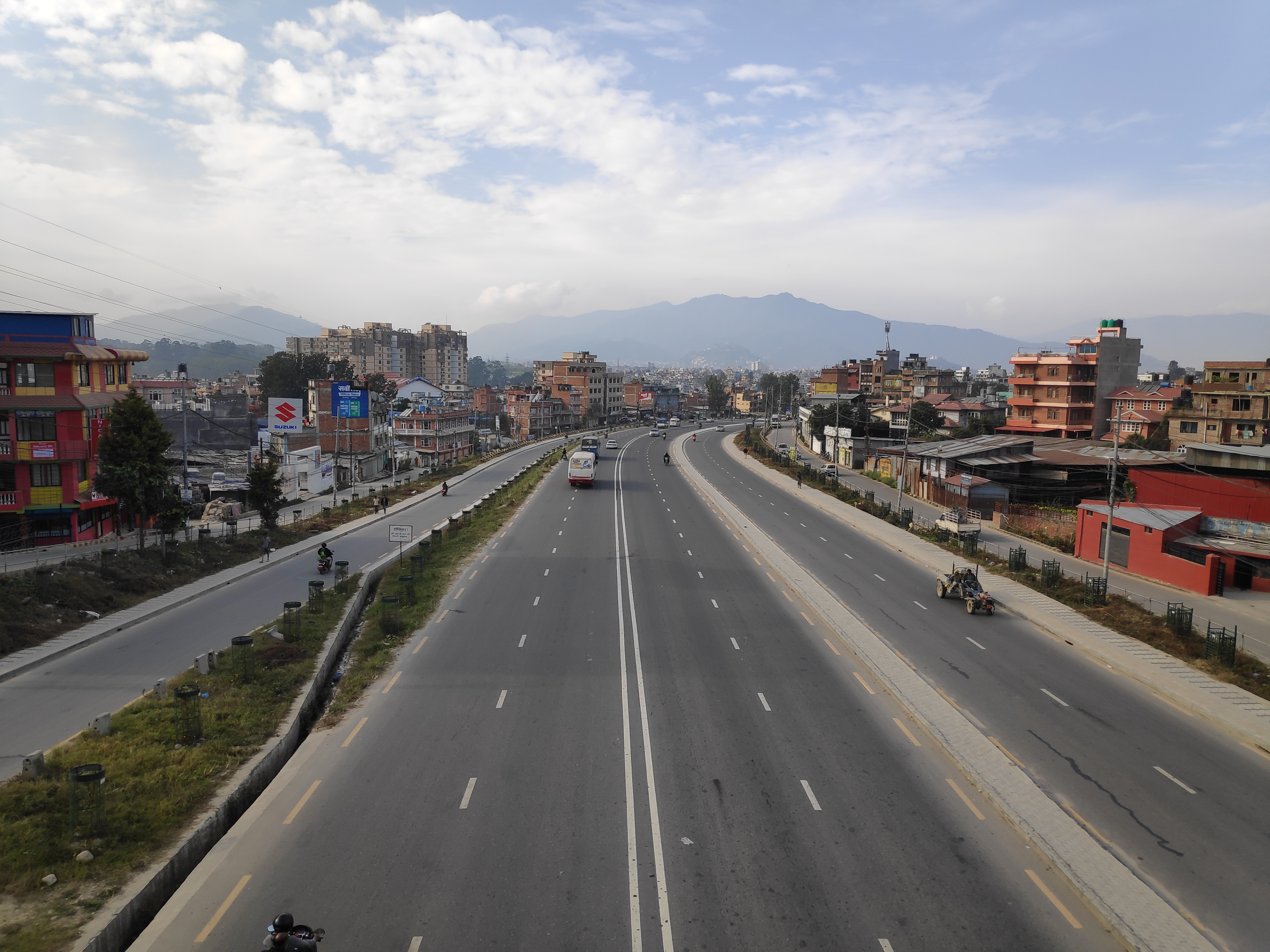
- Ring road at Dhobighat, Lalitpur

Route information
- Maintained by MoPIT (Department of Roads)
- Length: 27 km (17 mi)
- Existed: 1977–present

Major junctions
- Ring road around Kathmandu
- Balaju, Narayan Gopal Chowk, Chabahil, Gaushala, Tinkune, Koteshwor, Satdobato, Ekantkuna, Kalanki, Gongbu,

Location
- Country: Nepal
- Provinces: Bagmati Province
- Districts: Kathmandu District and Lalitapur District

Highway system
- Roads in Nepal
← NH38	→ NH40

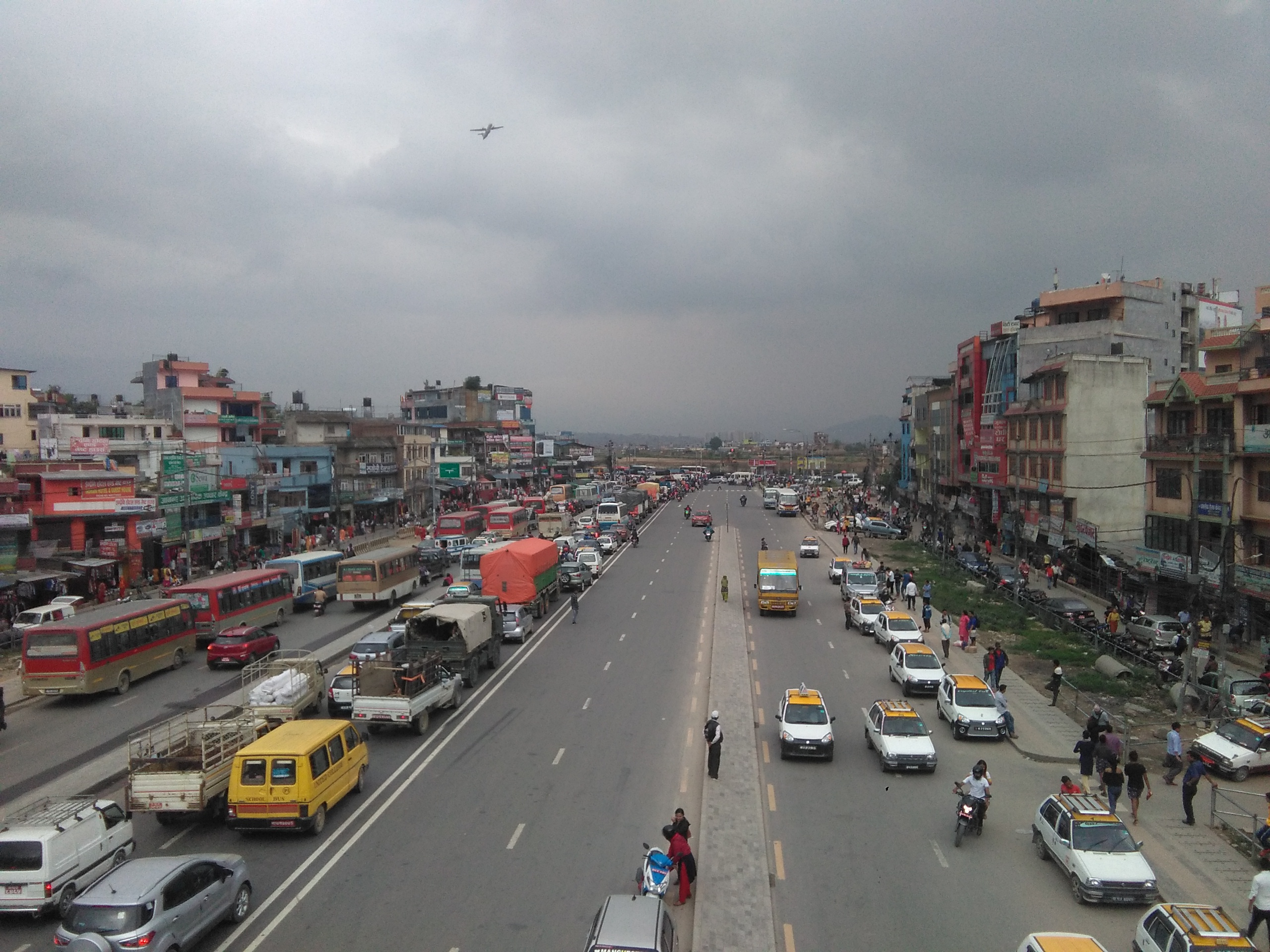
Ring Road at Koteshwor

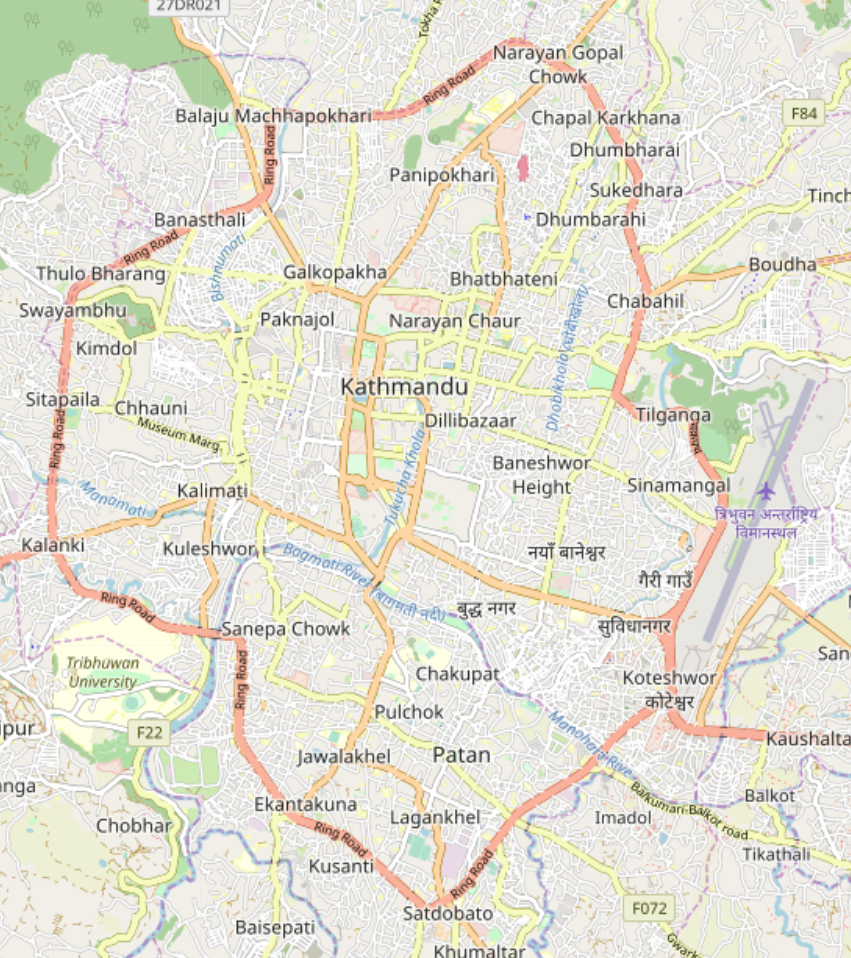
map of Kathmandu Ring Road

Kathmandu Ring Road or NH39 (previously: H16) (Nepali: काठमाडौं चक्रपथ) is an eight-lane ring road circling around the cities of Kathmandu and Lalitpur. The total length of the Ring Road is 27 kilometres (17 mi). It has a right of way of 62m (with 31m on either side of the center line).

== Route ==
The road connects major places like Kalanki, Satdobato, Gwarko, Balkumari, Koteswor, Tinkune, Tribhuvan International Airport, Gaushala, Chabhil, Sukedhara, Maharajganj, Basundhara, Samakhushi, Gongabu, Balaju, and Swayambhunath.

== History ==
In 2018, A section of 9.5 kilometres (5.9 mi) was expanded eight-lanes in cooperation of the Chinese government. To ease traffic congestion at Kalanki, Nepal's first underpass was constructed in 2018. In 2019, Ring Road served as a sporting venue for Cycling events at the 2019 South Asian Games.

=== Expansion ===
The government has decided to expedite construction of the proposed 71.93 km Outer Ring Road that is supposed to encircle most of the urban areas in Kathmandu Valley. The Detailed Project Report (DPR) was prepared in 2008.

== See also ==
- China-Nepal relations
- New Road of Kathmandu
- Mahendra Highway
- Kathmandu
