= Prithvi Highway =

Road in Nepal

Prithvi Highway पृथ्वी राजमार्ग
- राष्ट्रिय राजमार्ग १७
- National Highway 17
- Prithvi Highway in red
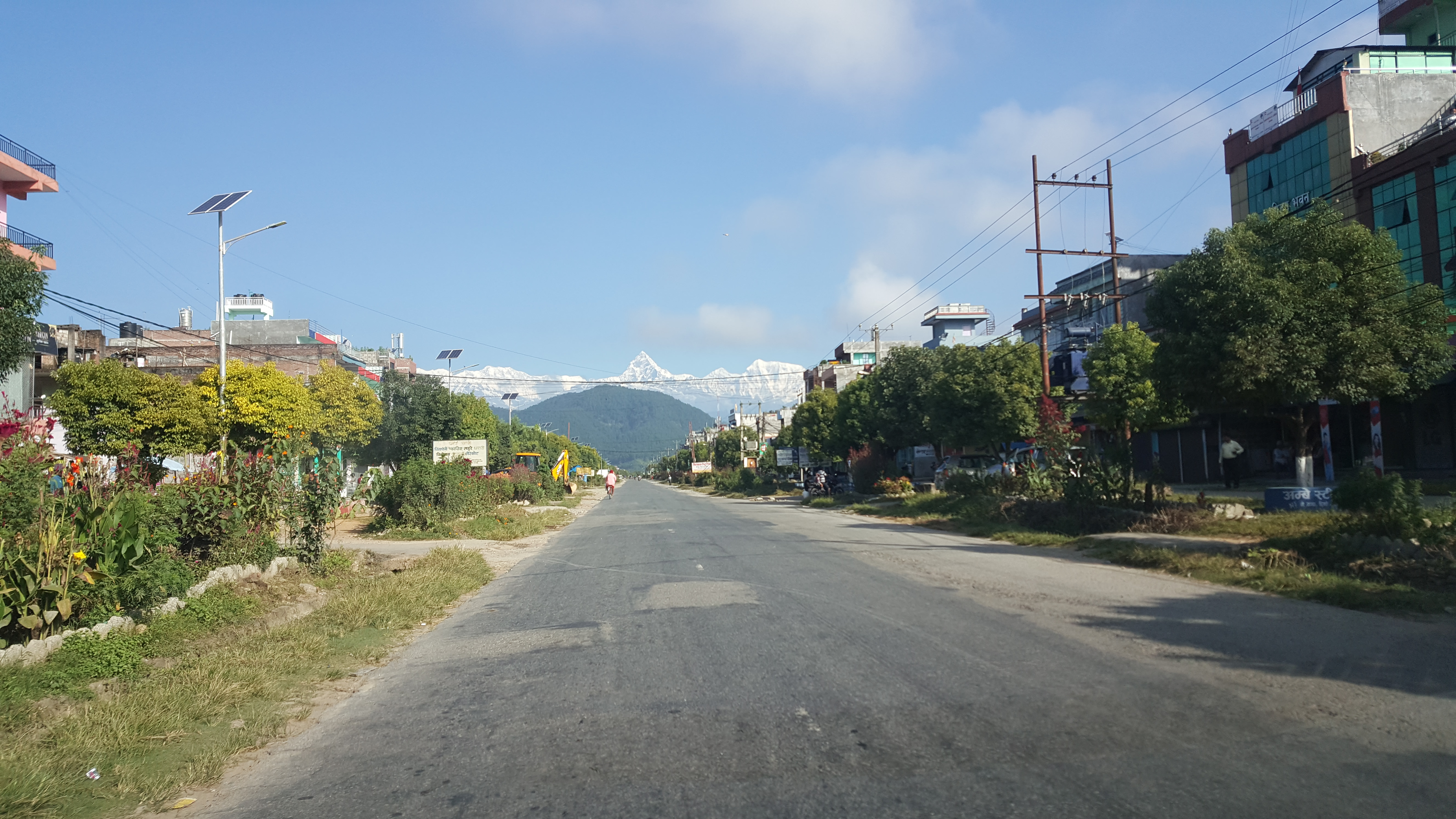
- Prithvi Highway at Dulegauda market

Route information
- Maintained by MoPIT (Department of Roads)
- Length: 174 km (108 mi)
- History: Completed in 1974

Major junctions
- East end: Naubise
- West end: Pokhara

Location
- Country: Nepal
- Primary destinations: Naubise, Galchhi, Gajuri, Malekhu, Kurintar, Mugling, Anbukhaireni, Dumre, Damauli, Pokhara

Highway system
- Roads in Nepal
← NH16	→ NH18

The Prithvi Highway or NH17 (previously: H04) (Nepali: पृथ्वी राजमार्ग) is a 174-kilometre-long (108 mi) highway connecting Naubise of Tribhuvan Highway, 26km from Kathmandu, the capital of Nepal, and Prithivi Chowk, Pokhara, a tourist city in the western part of Nepal.

== History ==
The construction of the highway started in 1967 with the help of the Chinese government. The construction was completed in 1974. The highway is named after King Prithvi Narayan Shah.

The highway was damaged by the 2026 Nepal floods.

== Route ==
This landslide-prone and heavily congested highway passes through five districts: Kathmandu, Dhading, Chitwan, Tanahu and Kaski. This highway has a junction with Tribhuvan Highway at Naubise. The Bharatpur-Mugling section connects this highway to Mahendra Highway, the longest highway in Nepal. The highway also connects Nuwakot District via a newly constructed road in Galchhi and connects to the district headquarter of Dhading District at Phurke Khola, Malekhu. Until 2011 opening of the B.P. Koirala Highway, this highway was the only improved land route from Kathmandu Valley to all points south, and as such the main artery for heavy trucks into Kathmandu Valley and into Pokhara.

The hills that flank the 206 km (128 mi) stretch of the Prithvi Highway from Kathmandu to Pokhara contain some of the most important religious sites in Nepal. Manakamana Mandir near Mugling, is one of the oldest temples in central Nepal and is an important destination for Hindu pilgrimage.

A 25 km (16 mi) road off the main highway connecting Pokhara and Kathmandu links to the historical town of Gorkha. Apart from these historic points of interest, the highway is lined with modern townships that have sprung up around important road junctions and river crossings. The scenery along the highway is dramatic as it follows a series of deep river valleys. On clear days, most of the way to Pokhara there are views of Machapuchare and the Annapurna massif.

The importance of the highway was reflected as three major highway bridges, near Mahadevbesi, Belkhu, and Malekhu were washed out by flood by the tributaries kholas of the Trishuli River in 1993. But now major issues with some bridges have been arising because of human encroachment near the foundations of the bridges as well as weak maintenance. The 370-metre (1,210 ft) bridge over the Madi River at Damauli may collapse due to a weakened foundation, as it was constructed at the same time as the highway with Chinese assistance. Sand and rock extraction nearby have weakened the pillars on a crucial bridge of Nepal's busiest highway. The bridge near Mugling faces maintenance problems from time to time.

The Krishna Bhir (Nepali: कृष्ण भीर) is a cliff located in Dhading District by the side of Prithivi Highway, approximately 83 km from Kathmandu Valley. It was one of the most landslide prone parts of the highway, Jogimara area being first to effect the traffic largely as the highway was opened for public. The steep elevation of the cliff compounded with the loose mud constituent of the cliff creates the vulnerability of landslide in monsoons. In 2004, Department of Roads, Nepal and a team of Nepalese bio-engineers have managed to prevent the landslide over a season which is considered as an achievement in modern Nepalese engineering.

There are some major issues faced by the highway. The traffic capacity of the highway, safety and grade issue of the road alignment in some locations. The traffic numbers on the road are increasing but not the service. Speeding and unawareness of other road users are creating hazards for both of the parties, however new road safety furniture has been installed along the highway. Some extensive studies are being done to address the problem faced by the highway at Naubise - Nagdhunga Section. For example, a Thankot - Naubise Road and Sitapaila - Dharke Road, which will reduce operation and maintenance cost of road and vehicle, after completion.

== Road conditions ==
The Prithvi Highway, because of the terrain it follows, the loading on the roads and amount of traffic it carries, has varied road conditions from Kathmandu Valley to Pokhara. The highway is a two-lane single carriageway road with at-grade intersections, sealed with Double Bituminous Surface Treatment in almost all areas except where regular maintenance is done with asphalt. There are no major intersections and no traffic lights. No passing lanes are being provided. Speed limits aren't applied on most of the section, except some warning signs near urban and town areas and a few sharp bends. There are many areas to be treated for high grades, sharp bends and visibility for all road users. Death tolls due to being hit by vehicle is high. Steep and windy sections don't have passing lanes (though some are being implemented in the Naubise - Nagdhunga section).

There are many sections along the highway with roughness and undulation which make the highway unsafe to drive. Road sections near Malekhu and Galchhi need extensive care because of the failure even after maintenance. Rutting, shoving have been the main problem in those areas. Vehicle axle load limit isn't in serious account. Sand trucks are one of the problems in the Gajuri to Nagdhunga section. Sand quarries along and near the highway aren't run in good state and are hindering the smooth flow of the vehicles.

The local intersections constructed by local residents are one of the new issues to be addressed before they become vital for road safety. No planning on construction of such intersections can be seen.

As the population residing on both sides of the highway are increasing, care should be taken for the safety along the highway. Proper signage and other roadside furniture are to be installed.

== Gallery ==
Prithvi Highway
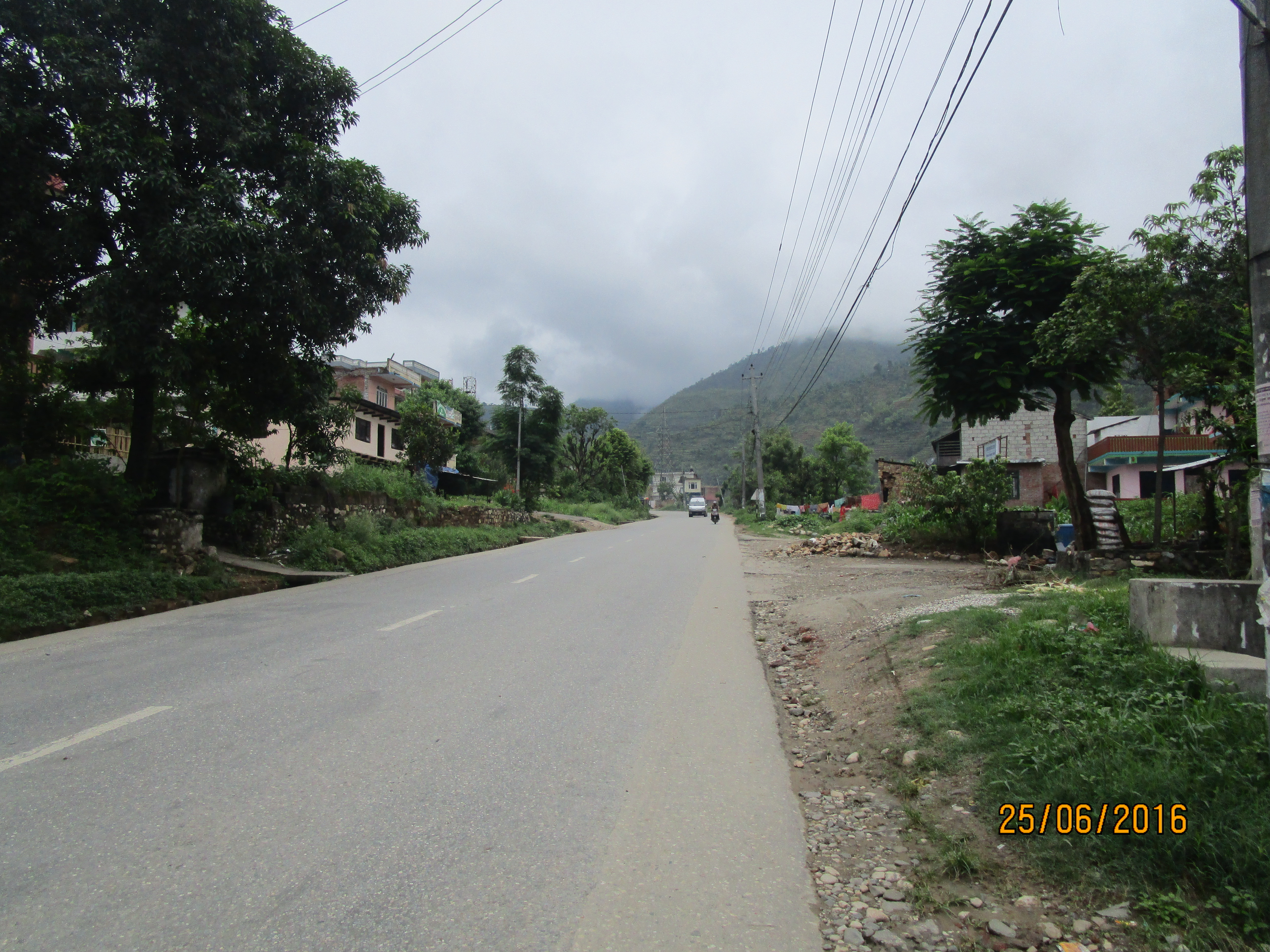
Prithvi Highway at Malekhu

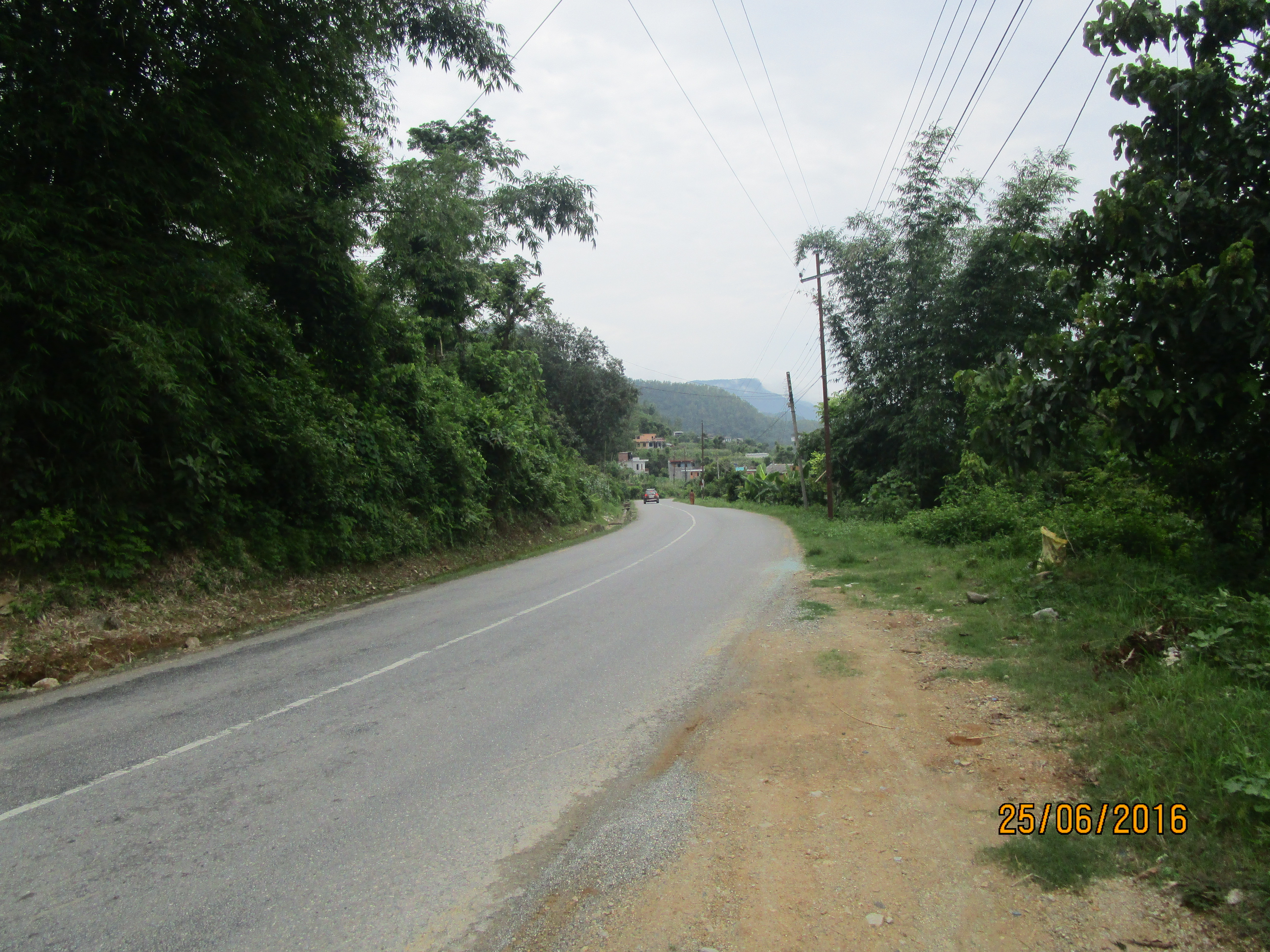
Prithvi Highway at Ghansikuwa

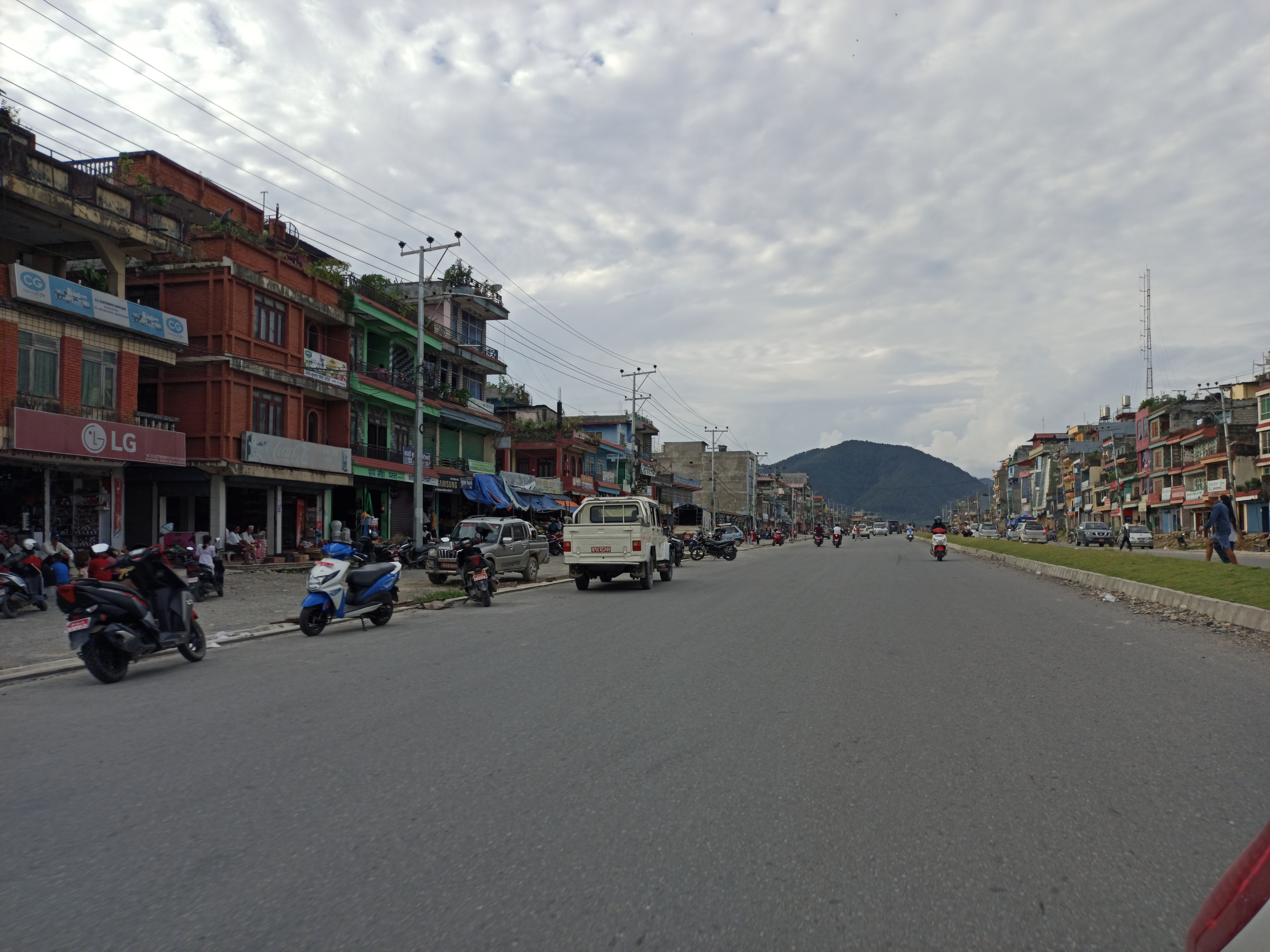
Dulegaunda Market in 2025, Tanahun District
