= Gungtang Township =

Village and township in the Tibet Autonomous Region of China

Coordinates: 28°49′N 84°48′E

Gungtang, (Note: Tibetan: གུང་ཐང, Wylie: gung thang, THL: gung tang, ZWPY: Kungtang. The alternative spelling of Kungtang is also seen English.) or Kotang, (Note: Tibetan: ཀོ་ཐང, Wylie: ko thang, THL: ko tang, ZWPY: Gotang.) called Gongdang by China, (Note: Chinese: 贡当乡; pinyin: Gòng dāng xiāng.) is a village and township in the Gyirong County in the Shigatse Prefecture, Tibet region of China.

In addition to Gungtang, the township contains three villages: Ru, Tsang (Zhang village) and Kangpo (Kangbei village).

== See also ==
- List of towns and villages in Tibet
