= Kanti Highway =

Highway in Nepal

Kanti Highway कान्ती लोकपथ
- राष्ट्रिय राजमार्ग ३७
- National Highway 37
- Kanti Highway in red

Route information
- Maintained by MoPIT (Department of Roads)
- Length: 79 km (49 mi)

Major junctions
- From: Lalitpur Metropolitan City, Lalitpur
- To: Hetauda Sub-Metropolitan City, Makwanpur

Location
- Country: Nepal

Highway system
- Roads in Nepal
← NH36	→ NH38

Kanti Highway or NH37 (Nepali: कान्ती लोकपथ) is a 92-kilometre-long (57 mi) national highway under construction in Bagmati Province, Nepal, that connects Lalitpur Metropolitan City to Hetauda Sub-Metropolitan City.

The construction on the road started in 1954 by King Mahendra, and the road was initially named Tikabhairab-Hetauda Road. However, in 1962, it was named Kanti Highway after the Queen Kanti of Nepal.

In the late 1990s, the Government of Nepal recognised this road as an alternative highway of Tribhuvan Highway (NH41) that connects Kathmandu to Birgunj on the Nepal-India border.
