= Malekhu =

Town in Bagmati Province, Nepal

Coordinates: 27.8097°N 84.829°E

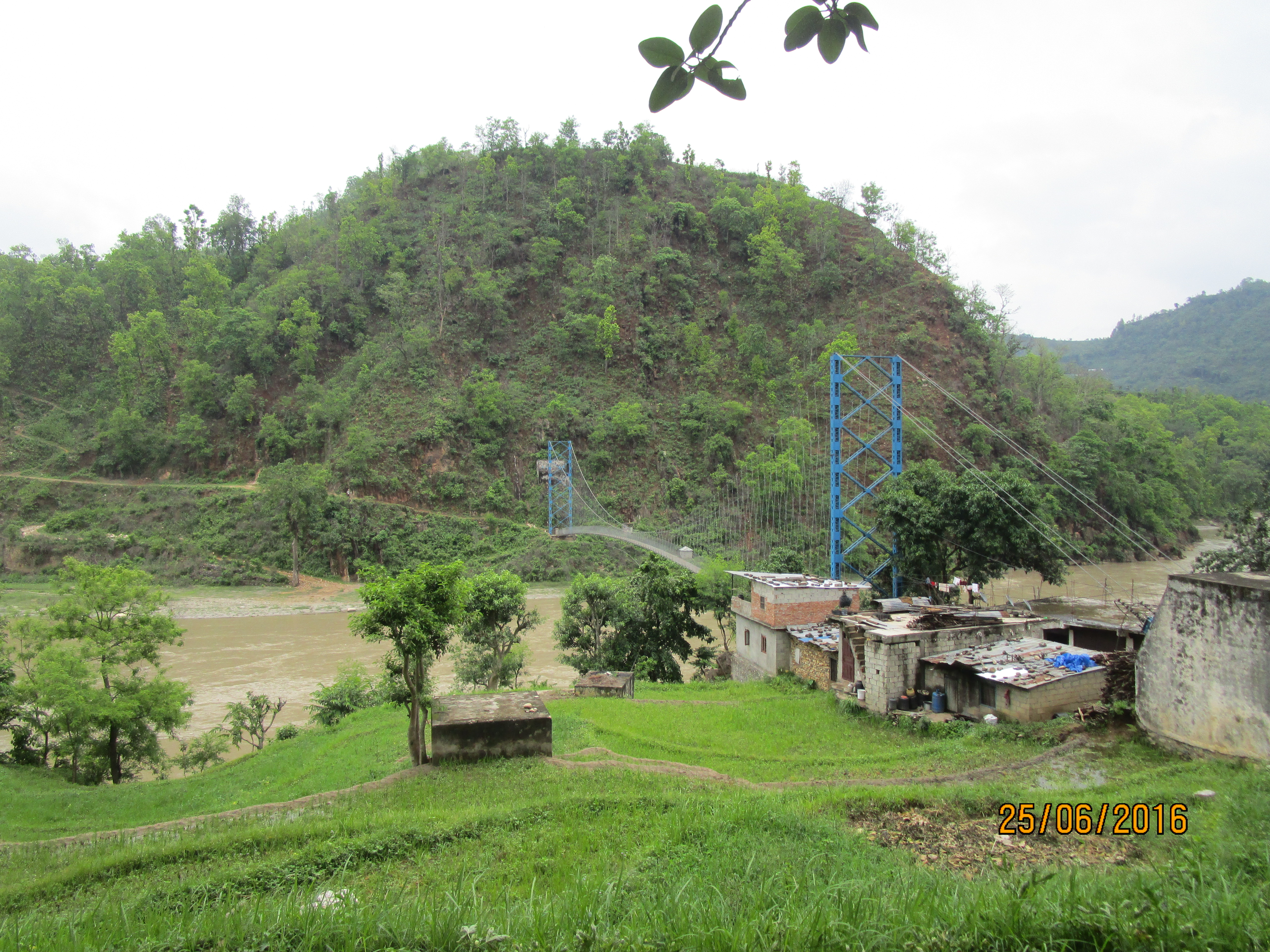
Trishuli River bridge at Malekhu

Malekhu (मलेखु) is a small town situated in Dhading district currently located in Gajuri Rural Municipality and Benighat Rural Municipality, halfway between Kathmandu and Narayangadh. It is situated in the bank of Trishuli River. It is famous for various types of fish species and its product. Malekhu is widely popular for adventurous sports such as rafting, trekking, kayaking and so on. It is one of the most exciting and dangerous rafting sites of the world. It is situated near the famous Manakamana Temple which is at the distance of 30 km from the town. It is also famous for hiking. The main attraction of Malekhu also includes the geological researches and geological minerals present there. International as well as national Geology students get to there for geological studies, the availability of different minerals is also gathered in small area in there. The larger portion of the population consists mostly of Tripathis, Silwals and Kadels and Barakotis.

== Transport ==
Malekhu lies on the Prithvi Highway (NH17), approximately 70 km (43 mi) west of Kathmandu. It serves as a road junction where the northbound Feeder Road F034 crosses the Trishuli River toward Dhading Besi, the administrative headquarters of Dhading District. This northern corridor continues from Dhading Besi through Soti Khola into the Budhi Gandaki valley toward Machha Khola, making Malekhu the primary highway turnoff from Kathmandu for trekkers heading to the Manaslu Circuit trek.
