= Bhandara, Nepal =

Bhandara भण्डारा
- Location in Nepal
- Coordinates: 27.60°N 84.65°E
- Country: Nepal
- Province: Bagmati Province
- District: Chitwan District

Government

Population (2011)
  - Total: 16,121
- Time zone: UTC+5:45 (Nepal Time)
- Postal Code: 44202
- Area code: 056

Bhandara (Nepali: भण्डारा bhandara) lies in the eastern part of Chitwan District in Bagmati Province of southern Nepal. It is a ward of Rapti Municipality, formally Village development committee.

At the time of the 2011 Nepal census it had a population of 16,121 people (7,529 male; 8,592 female) living in 3,489 individual households.
