= Chhatre Dyaurali =

Chhatre Dyaurali छत्रेदेउराली
- Village development committee
- Location in Nepal
- Coordinates: 27.76°N 85.24°E
- Country: Nepal
- Zone: Bagmati Zone
- District: Dhading District

Government

Population (1991)
  - Total: 7,501
  - Religions: Hindu
- Time zone: UTC+5:45 (Nepal Time)

Chhatre Dyaurali is a village development committee in Dhading District in the Bagmati Zone of central Nepal. At the time of the 1991 Nepal census it had a population of 7501 and had 1327 houses in it.
