= Dzongka =

Town in Tibet Autonomous Region of China

Dzongka རྫོང་དགའ · 宗嘎镇
- Town
- Zongga
- Interactive map of Dzongka
- Location within Tibet
- Coordinates (Dzongka Town government): 28°51′22″N 85°17′48″E
- Country: People's Republic of China
- Autonomous region: Tibet
- Prefecture-level city: Shigatse
- County: Gyirong (Kyirong)

Dzongka (Tibetan: རྫོང་དགའ, Wylie: rdzong dga', THL: dzong ga) or Zongga (Chinese: 宗嘎镇; pinyin: Zōnggá Zhèn) is a town and the administrative headquarters of Gyirong County in the southwestern Tibet region of China bordering Nepal. Being the administrative headquarters, it is also sometimes referred to as "Gyirong Dzong" or "Gyirong Town", but it is different from the original Kyirong Town in the southern part of the county.

Dzongka and Gyirong County were on the ancient trade route between the Kathmandu Valley and Tibet. During the 18th century, the region faced an invasion from Nepal, which resulted in some destruction of the town.

== Name ==
"Dzongka" means "mud wall" in Tibetan. The town had eight-metre-high mud walls around it, which is believed to have led to this popular name. The original name of the town, as well as the region, was Gungthang (var: Gungtang, Wylie: gung thang).

== Geography ==
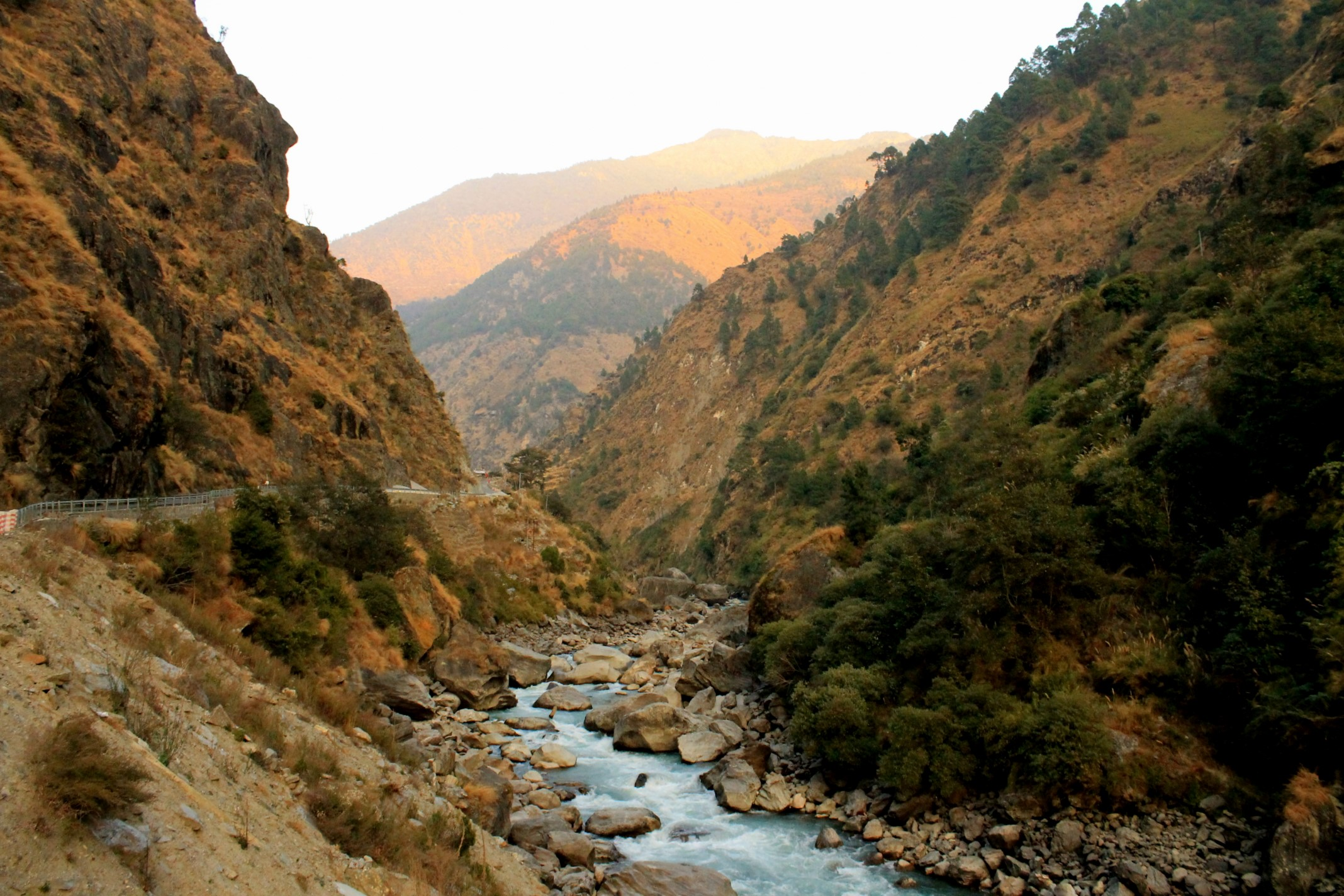
Kyirong Tsangpo (Trisuli) river

Dzongka lies at an altitude of 4,130 metres (13,550 ft) in the valley of Kyirong Tsangpo near the confluence of its two source streams, Zarong Chu and Gyang Chu.

The Kyirong Tsangpo valley, which continues into Nepal as the Trishuli River, has provided the ancient trade route between the Kathmandu Valley and Tibet.

The Dzongka township contains six villages in addition to its own town community: Phula, Jiamu village, Gong village, Tsalung (Zalong), Xia village, and Orma (Woma village).

== History ==
=== Early and medieval ===
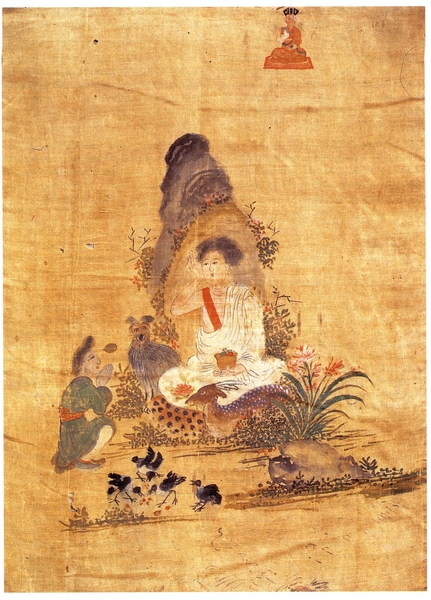
Milarepa, painting by the 10th Karmapa

Dzongka was the capital of the kingdom of Gungthang, which covered the upper Kyirong Tsangpo valley (while Kyirong Town was the capital of Mangyul—the lower Kyirong valley). The walled fortification of the town is said to have been built by a king named Chen Lhamchok De (gcen lha-mchog lde), often called Dolé.

Gungthang, along with the neighbouring kingdom of Lo (now in Nepal), were regarded as part of Ngari Me ("Lower Ngari"). (Note: The present day Ngari Prefecture of Tibet does not include Ngari Me.) The entire Ngari region, which was originally part of the Zhangzhung kingdom, was conquered by Central Tibet around 645 AD. (Note: Scholar David P. Jackson remarks that "Ngari" can be understood as "conquered land", perhaps a reference to this conquest.) In the 8th century, Indian Buddhist preachers such as Padmasambhava and Śāntarakṣita visited Tibet using the route through Nepal and Gungthang.

By the 10th century, the Central Tibetan empire fragmented with rival factions fighting for power and regional power centres rising. In 910 AD, the Tibetan ruler Depal Khortsen was murdered, and his two sons fled to Ngari. The elder son, Kyide Nyimagon, went to establish a kingdom in Ngari To ("Upper Ngari") and the younger son, Tashi Tsekpa-pel (Bkra-shis-brtsegs-pa-dpal), came to Ngari Me, establishing the Gungthang kingdom at Dzongka. The descendants of Tashi Tsekpa continued to rule Gungthang till the eventual absorption into Tsang in the 17th century.

Milarepa (1040–1123), called Tibet's greatest poet-saint, was born at Tsalung, a village in the Dzongka township. He was a contemporary of the ruler Lhamchok De. Milarepa spent a good part of his life at Drakar Taso ("eagle's nest"), a hermitage on the border between Gungthang and Mangyul.

In the late 12th century, a Gungthang princess was sent to Sakya as the third consort of Zangtsa Sonam Gyeltsen (zangs tsha bsod nams rgyal mtshan). This obtained for Gungthang the powerful protection of the Sakya hierarchs. As the Sakya allied with the Mongols, Gungthang became an important power centre in Ngari. In 1290, the forces of Kublai Khan fought those of the Chagatai Khanate at Dzongka over the control of Tibet, and defeated them.

With the decline of Sakya and the Mongol Yuan dynasty, Gungthang's period of ascendance came to an end in the 14th century. For a time, Gungthang was eclipsed by Yatse, but it continued nevertheless with a reduced status. In 1620, the kingdom was sacked by Tsang and became part of Central Tibet. In 1642, the Ganden Phodrang administration under the Fifth Dalai Lama was established by the Mongols over the whole of Central Tibet.

== Maps ==
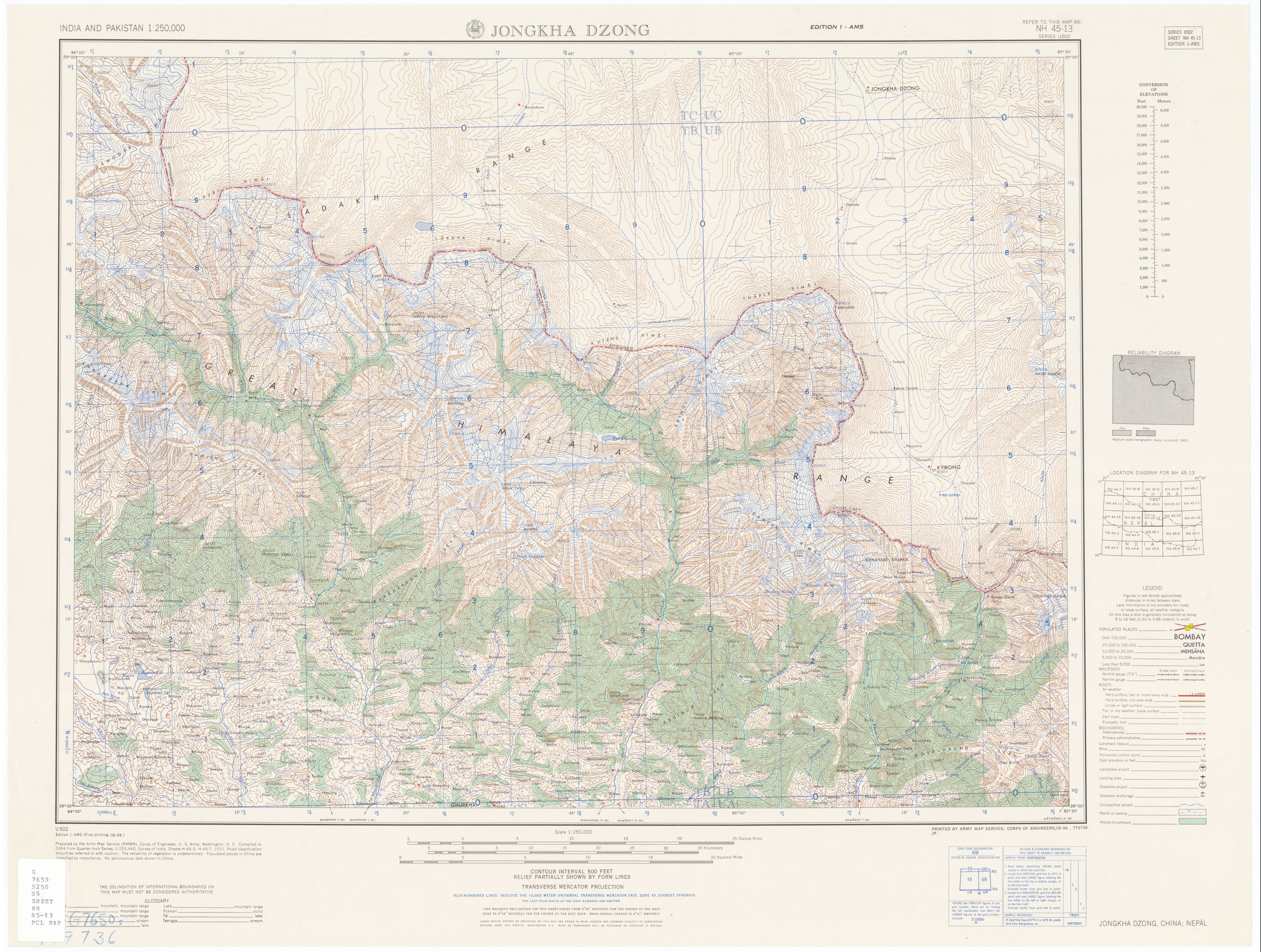
Map including "Jongkha Dzong" (AMS, 1955)

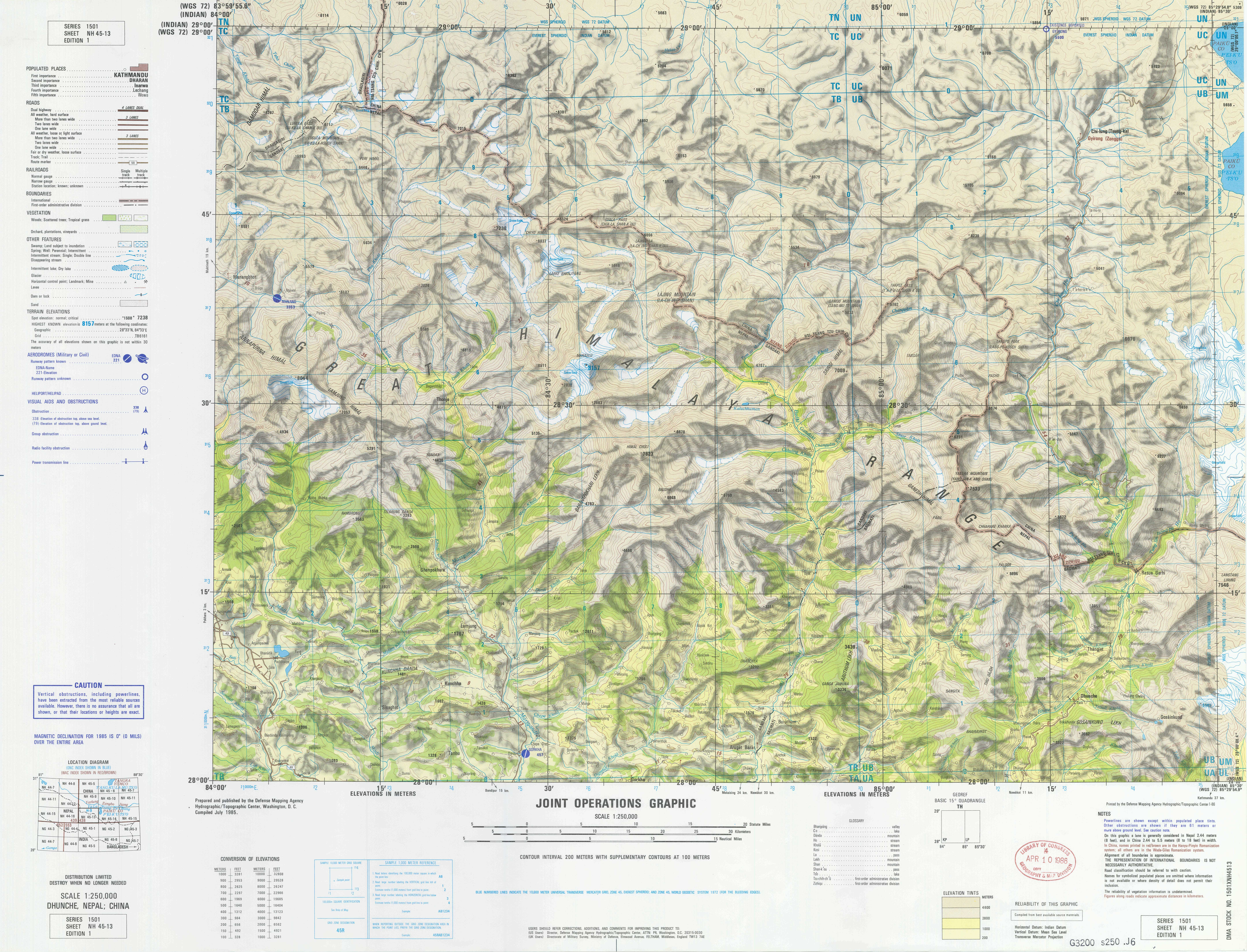
Map including "Gyirong (Zongga)" (DMA, 1985)

== See also ==
- List of towns and villages in Tibet

== Bibliography ==
- Chan, Victor (1994), Tibet Handbook, Moon Publications – via archive.org
- Diemberger, Hildegard (2014). When a Woman Becomes a Religious Dynasty: The Samding Dorje Phagmo of Tibet. Columbia University Press. ISBN 978-0-231-14321-9.
- Dorje, Gyurme (2004), Footprint Tibet Handbook with Bhutan (3rd ed.), Bath: Footprint Handbooks, ISBN 1-903471-30-3 – via archive.org
- Jackson, David P. (1976), "The early history of Lo (Mustang) and Ngari" (PDF), Journal of the Institute of Nepal and Asian Studies, 4 (1), Kathmandu: Tribhuvan University: 39–56
- Roberts, Peter Alan (2007). The Biographies of Rechungpa: The Evolution of a Tibetan Hagiography. Routledge. ISBN 978-1-135-98912-5.
  - Roberts, Peter Alan (2000), The Biographies of Ras-chung-pa: The Evolution of a Tibetan Hagiography, University of Oxford
- Ryavec, Karl E. (2015), A Historical Atlas of Tibet, University of Chicago Press, ISBN 978-0-226-24394-8
