= Gyirong County =

Gyirong County སྐྱིད་གྲོང་རྫོང་། • 吉隆县 Kyirong; Jilong
- County
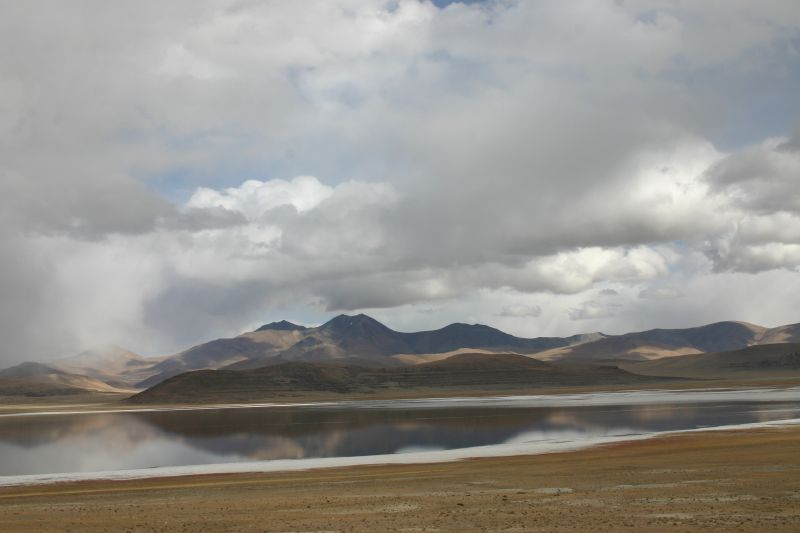
- Tso Drolung (Drolung Lake)

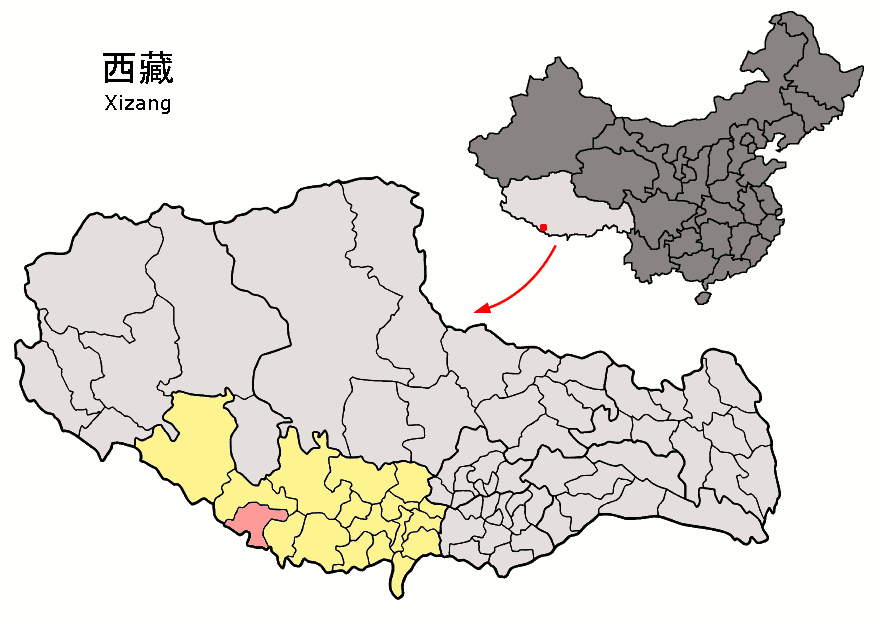
- Location of Gyirong County (red) within Shigatse City (yellow) and the Tibet Autonomous Region

- Location of the seat in Tibet Kyirong (China)
- Coordinates: 28°51′16″N 85°17′48″E
- Country: China
- Autonomous region: Tibet
- Prefecture-level city: Shigatse
- County seat: Dzongka

Area
  - Total: 9,019.7 km^{2} (3,482.5 sq mi)

Population (2020)
  - Total: 17,536
  - Density: 1.9442/km^{2} (5.0354/sq mi)
- Time zone: UTC+8 (China Standard)
- Website: www.jilong.gov.cn

Gyirong County

Chinese name
- Simplified Chinese: 吉隆县
- Traditional Chinese: 吉隆縣
Transcriptions
Standard Mandarin
- Hanyu Pinyin: Jílóng Xiàn

Tibetan name
- Tibetan: སྐྱིད་གྲོང་རྫོང་།
Transcriptions
- Wylie: skyid grong rdzong
- THL: kyi rong dzong
- Tibetan Pinyin: Gyirong Zong

Gyirong County (Tibetan: སྐྱིད་གྲོང་རྫོང་།; Chinese: 吉隆县; also transliterated as Kyirong or Jilong) is a county of the Shigatse, Tibet Autonomous Region, China. It is famous for its mild climatic conditions and its abundant vegetation which is unusual for the Tibetan plateau. The capital lies at Zongga (Gungthang). Its name in Tibetan, Dzongka, means "mud walls".

It is one of the four counties that comprise the Qomolangma National Nature Preserve (Kyirong, Dinggyê, Nyalam, and Tingri).

In 1945, Peter Aufschnaiter counted 26 temples and monasteries which covered the area of Gyirong and the neighboring La-sdebs. The most famous temple of Gyirong is the Byams-sprin lha-khang, erected by the famous Tibetan king Songtsen Gampo as one of the four Yang-´dul temples in the 7th century A.D. During the 11th century, the famous South Asian scholar Atisha visited Gyirong. Gyirong was one of the favorite meditation places of the Tibetan Yogin Milarepa.

The local Kyirong language has been researched thoroughly and folk literature of this region was collected and published during the 1980's.

Being downstream of many glaciers on the Poiqu River, Gyirong is vulnerable to flooding.

== Special places ==
Of outstanding importance are the Byams-sprin lha-khang temple, which was built in the 7th century AD, and the ´Phags-pa lha-khang temple. The ´Phags-pa lha-khang formerly contained one of the holiest Avalokiteshvara statues of Tibet, the statue of the Ārya Va-ti bzang-po. This statue was brought to India in 1959 and is now kept in Dharamsala.

Of some importance is the bKra-shis bdam-gtan gling monastery, founded by Yeshe Gyaltsen (1713–1793), who was one of the teachers of the 8th Dalai Lama.

Lake Paiku is in this county. This is a 27 km (17 mi) long, slightly salty lake surrounded by snowy peaks 5,700 to 6,000 m (18,700 to 19,700 ft) high.

Another place is Sanjen Valley, located at the foot of the Sanchen Glaciers and Yangra Mountain. It is also called a Hidden Valley of Tibet. It is very small valley used seasonally by the Nomadic peoples of Nepal and Tibet.

== Administration divisions ==
Gyirong County is divided into 2 towns and 4 townships.

Name	Chinese	Hanyu Pinyin	Tibetan	Wylie
Towns
Dzongka Town (Zongga)	宗嘎镇	Zōnggā zhèn	རྫོང་དགའ་གྲོང་རྡལ།	rdzong dga' grong rdal
Kyirong Town (Gyirong)	吉隆镇	Jílóng zhèn	སྐྱིད་གྲོང་གྲོང་རྡལ།	skyid grong grong rdal
Townships
Drakna Township	差那乡	Chànà xiāng	བྲག་སྣ་ཤང་།	brag sna shang
Trepa Township	折巴乡	Zhébā xiāng	ཀྲེ་པ་ཤང་།	kre pa shang
Gungtang Township	贡当乡	Gòngdāng xiāng	གུང་ཐང་ཤང་།	gung thang shang
Sale Township	萨勒乡	Sàlè xiāng	ས་ལེ་ཤང་།	sa le shang

== Transportation ==
Up to 1960, one of the main trade routes between Nepal and Tibet passed through this region. Easily accessible from Nepal, it was used several times as an entrance gate for military actions from the site of Nepal against Tibet. In 2017, Chinese soldiers began building a new road on the Tibetan side of the border, and intend to continue construction into Nepal via Rasuwa pending approval from Kathmandu.

A possibility of a transborder railway link along a similar route (Gyirong to Kathmandu via Rasuwa) is considered as well.

Gyirong Port was modernised in the 2010s, becoming a modern logistics hub at the Nepal–China border. The area was devastated in the 2026 Nepal floods.

== Maps ==
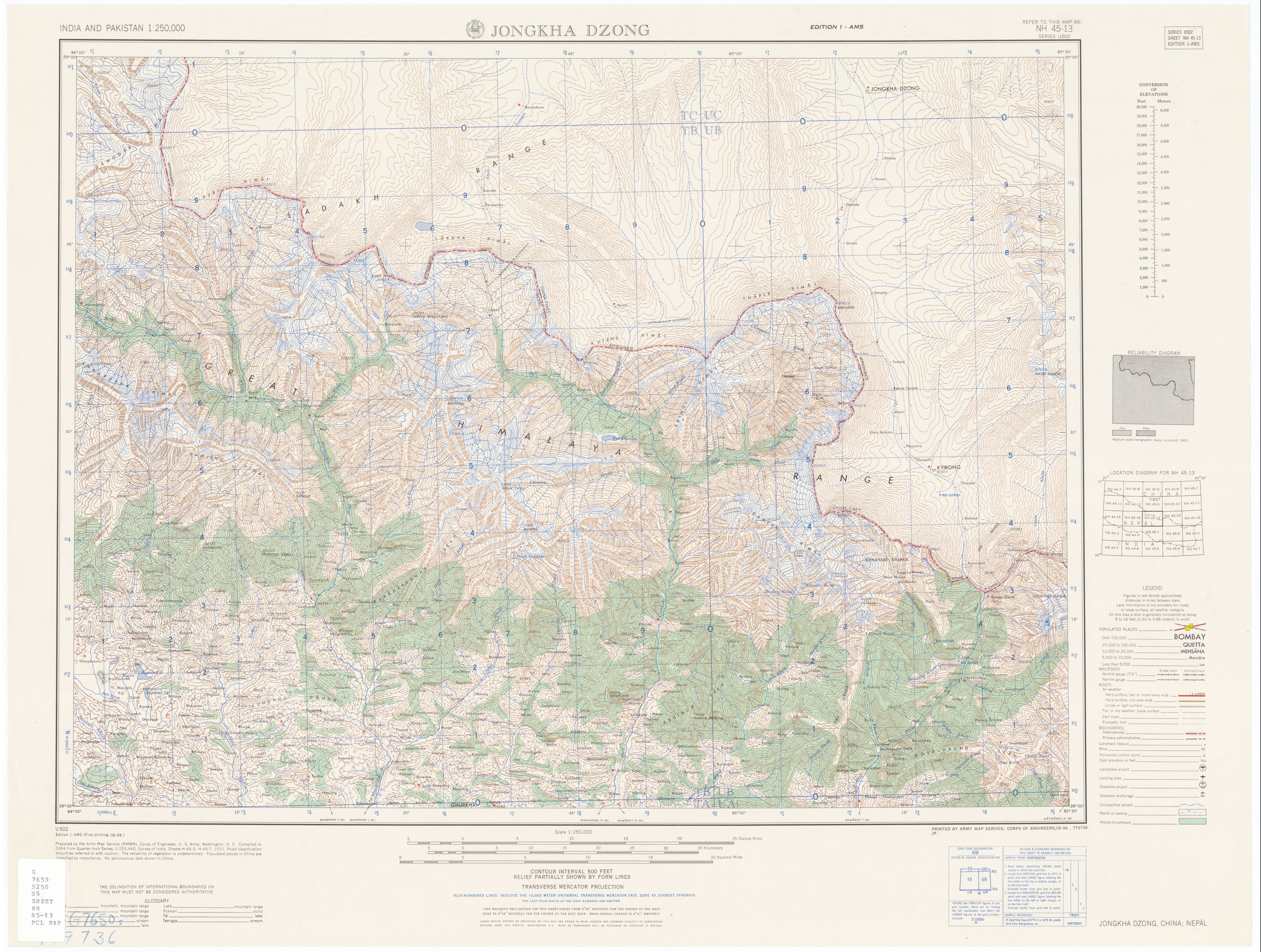
Map including part of Kyirong County (AMS, 1955)

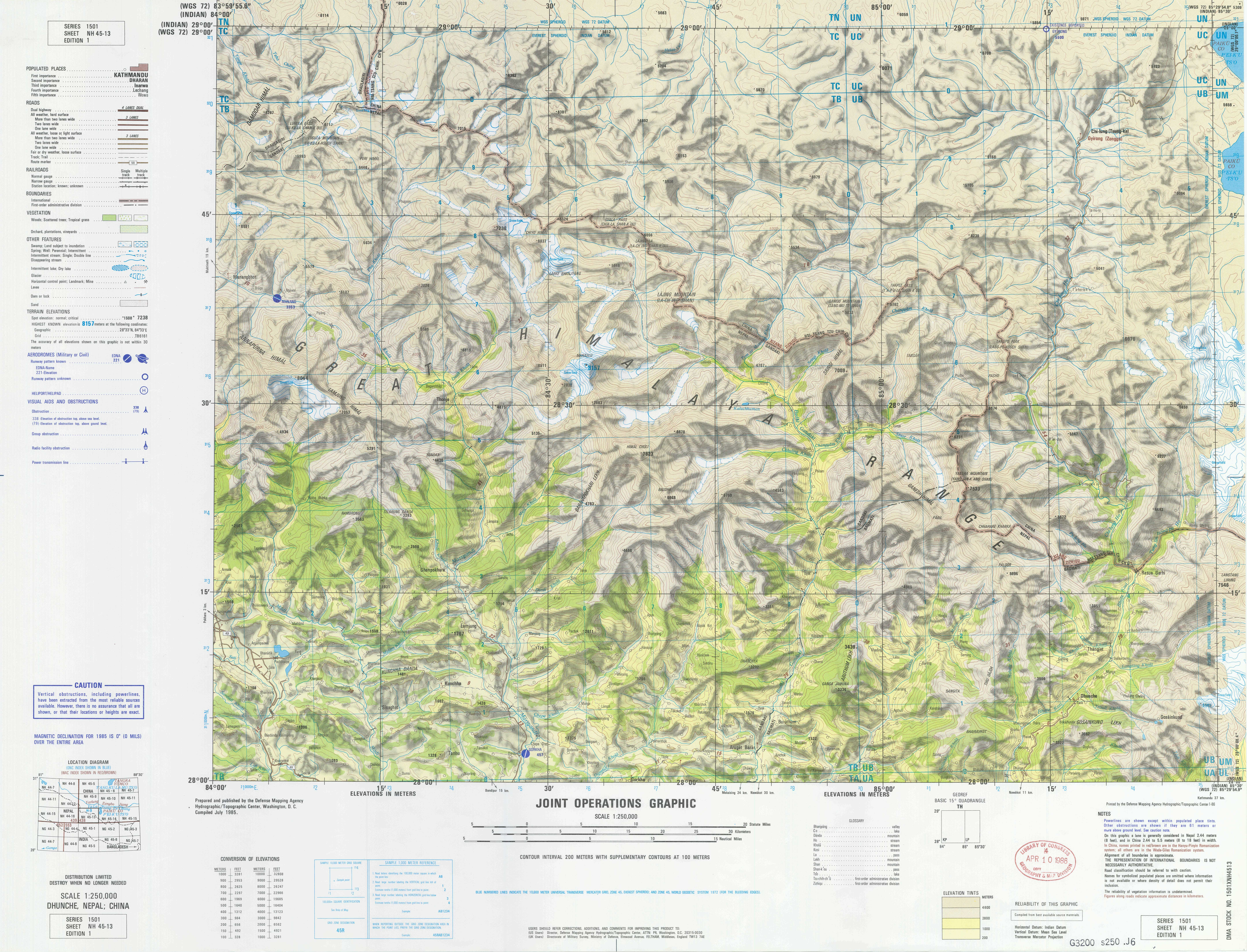
Map including "Gyirong (Zongga)" (DMA, 1985)

== Bibliography ==
- Chan, Victor (1994), Tibet Handbook, Moon Publications – via archive.org
- Diemberger, Hildegard (2014). When a Woman Becomes a Religious Dynasty: The Samding Dorje Phagmo of Tibet. Columbia University Press. ISBN 978-0-231-14321-9.
- Dorje, Gyurme (2004), Footprint Tibet Handbook with Bhutan (3rd ed.), Bath: Footprint Handbooks, ISBN 1-903471-30-3 – via archive.org
- Jackson, David P. (1976), "The early history of Lo (Mustang) and Ngari" (PDF), Journal of the Institute of Nepal and Asian Studies, 4 (1), Kathmandu: Tribhuvan University: 39–56
- Roberts, Peter Alan (2007). The Biographies of Rechungpa: The Evolution of a Tibetan Hagiography. Routledge. ISBN 978-1-135-98912-5.
  - Roberts, Peter Alan (2000), The Biographies of Ras-chung-pa: The Evolution of a Tibetan Hagiography, University of Oxford
- Ryavec, Karl E. (2015), A Historical Atlas of Tibet, University of Chicago Press, ISBN 978-0-226-24394-8
- Roland Bielmeier, Silke Herrmann: Märchen, Sagen und Schwänke vom Dach der Welt. Tibetisches Erzählgut in Deutscher Fassung, Band 3. Viehzüchtererzählungen sowie Erzählgut aus sKyid-grong und Ding-ri, gesammelt und ins Deutsche übertragen. Vereinigung für Geschichtswissenschaft Hochasiens Wissenschaftsverlag (= Beiträge zur tibetischen Erzählforschung, 3), Sankt Augustin 1982
- Harrer, Heinrich: Seven Years in Tibet; Beyond Seven Years in Tibet: My Life Before, During, and After (2007)
- Aufschnaiter, Peter: Land and Places of Milarepa. East and West, 26 (1976):1-2, S. 175-189
- Brauen, Martin: Heinrich Harrers Impressionen aus Tibet. Innsbruck, 1974
- Brauen, Martin: Peter Aufschnaiter. Sein Leben in Tibet. Innsbruck, 1983
- Ehrhard, Franz-Karl: Die Statue des Ārya Va-ti bzang-po. Wiesbaden, 2004
- Huber, Brigitte: The Tibetan Dialect of Lende (Kyi-rong): a grammatical description with historical annotations. Bonn, 2005
- Dieter Schuh: Das Archiv des Klosters bKra-shis bsam-gtan gling von sKyid-grong. Bonn, 1988
