= Gyirong Town =

Gyirong Town སྐྱིད་གྲོང་ · 吉隆镇 · केरुङ
- Town
- Kyirong Town
- Interactive map of Gyirong Town
- Location in Tibet Automomous Region
- Coordinates (Gyirong Town government): 28°23′36″N 85°19′45″E
- Country: People's Republic of China
- Autonomous region: Tibet
- Prefecture-level city: Shigatse
- County: Gyirong
- Elevation: 2,774 m (9,101 ft)

Gyirong or Kyirong (Tibetan: སྐྱིད་གྲོང་, Wylie: skyid grong, THL: kyi rong), Jilong in Chinese (Chinese: 吉隆鎮; pinyin: Jílóng zhèn) and Kerung in Nepalese (Nepali: केरुङ), is a town situated in the southern part of Gyirong County in the Tibet Autonomous Region, China. The town is situated on the east bank of Gyirong Tsangpo, a source stream of the Trishuli River, at an elevation of about 2,700 metres (8,900 ft). It has a subtropical mountain monsoon climate, with reasonable precipitation and warm weather, unusual for Tibet.

== Geography ==
Gyirong Town
- Traditional Chinese: 吉隆鎮
- Simplified Chinese: 吉隆镇
- Hanyu Pinyin: Jílóng zhèn
- Literal meaning: "Gyirong Village"
Transcriptions
Standard Mandarin
- Hanyu Pinyin: Jílóng zhèn

Gyirong Town is 70 kilometres (43 mi) south of the county seat of Dzongka, and roughly 25 km (16 mi) north of Rasuwa Fort on the China-Nepal border where the Gyirong Port border crossing into Nepal was located.

In Gyirong Town, there is a village of ethnic Nepali referred to as Daman people. They are descendants of the Nepalese Gurkha army from centuries ago. Previously stateless, they were granted Chinese citizenship in 2003.

== History ==
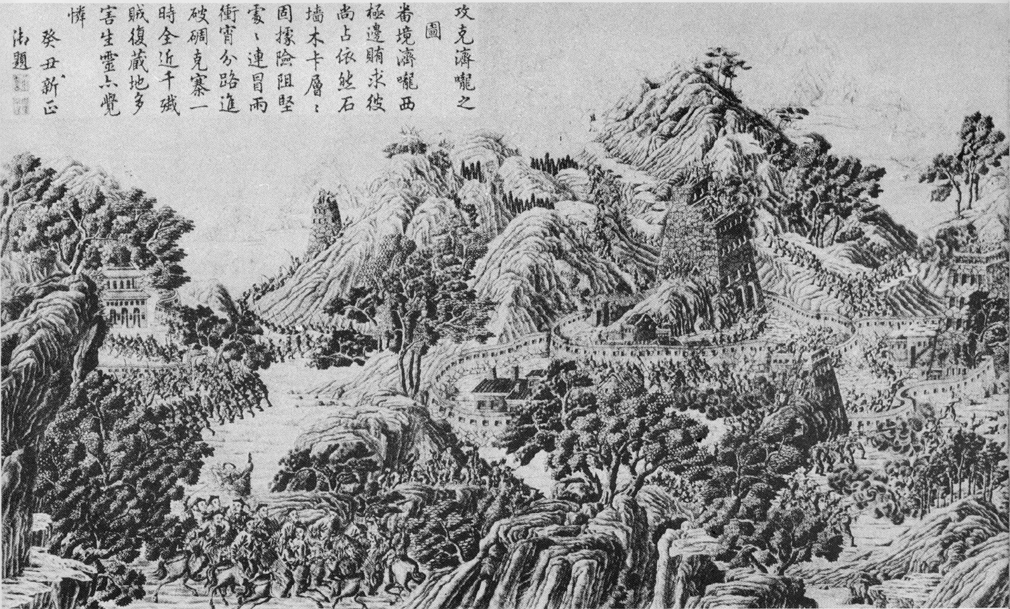
1792 battle as depicted in Chinese painting

After the division of the Tibetan Empire, descendants of Songtsen Gampo fled to Kyirong and then founded the Gongtang Kingdom, whose ruins are now in Kyirong.

During the first campaign of the Sino-Nepalese War in the late-1780s, the Nepalese forces captured Kyirong. It was recaptured by joint Chinese and Tibetan forces during the second campaign in July 1792.

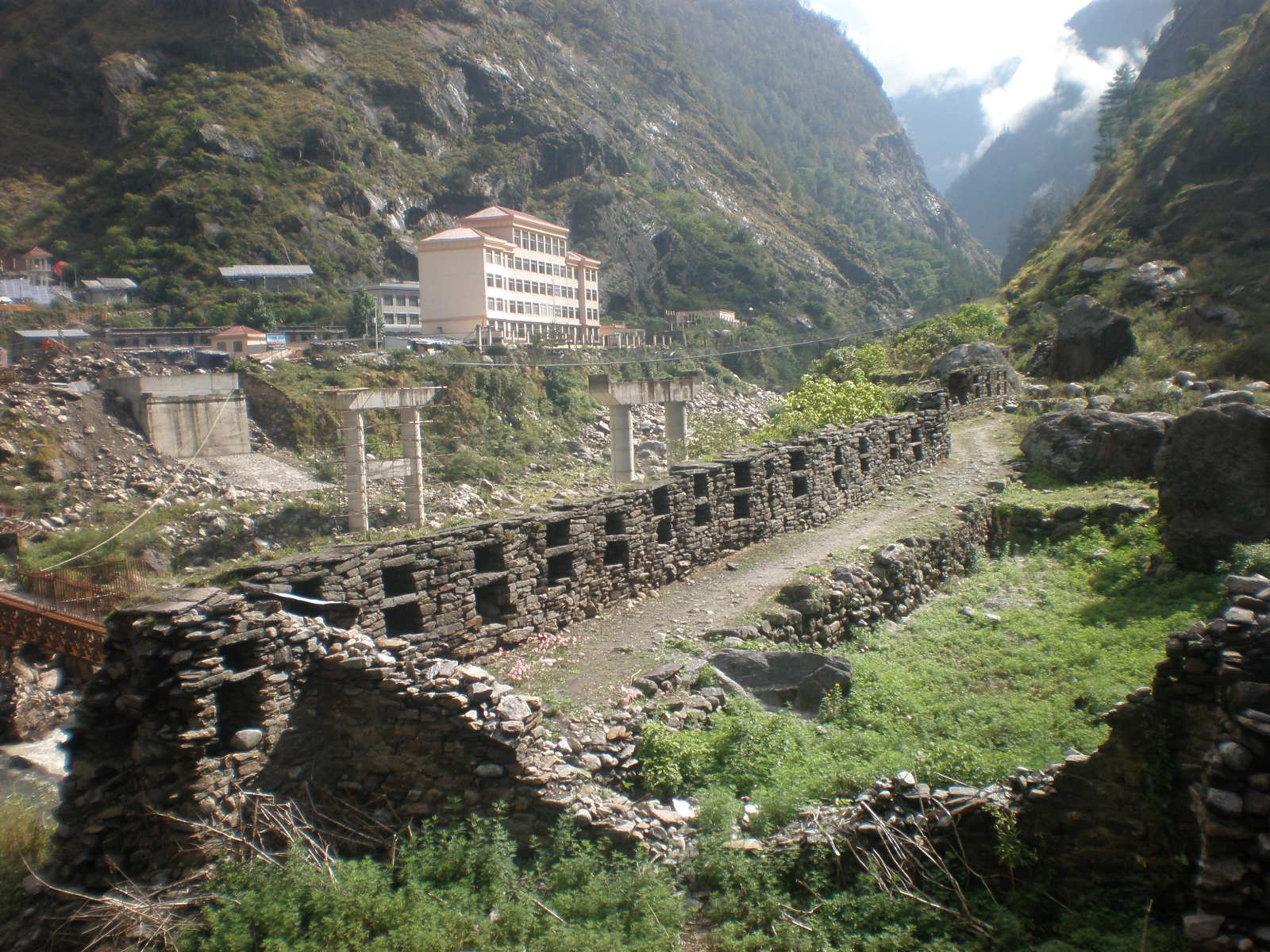
The China-Nepal Gyirong Port border crossing at Rasuwa Fort, seen here under construction in 2013, was destroyed by the 2026 Nepal floods.

Historically, Gyirong Town has been an important town in the cross border trade between China and Nepal as it was located on a major traditional trade thoroughfare between the two countries. In 1961, Gyirong was established as a port of entry from Rasuwa Fort in Nepal by the Chinese government. In December 2014, the Gyirong port of entry was opened to international users and this route between China and Nepal was considered to be more reliable than the one through the Zhangmu-Kodari border crossing.

=== The April 2015 earthquake ===
Gyirong/Rasuwa played a minor role as a cross-border trade route until about a year after the April 2015 Nepal earthquake as the cross-border route through the Zhangmu-Kodari border crossing was more badly damaged, only reopening on 29 May 2019. Both corridors sustained quake damage and had been closed due to the collapse of the border bridges at both locations and due to continuing rockfall from unstable hillsides, the Gyirong/Rasuwa crossing being technically easier to re-open.

The Gyirong-Rasuwa Fort route experienced quicker recovery since it is favoured for trans-Himalayan connectivity due to lower elevation and a gentler pass slope. A temporary bridge was constructed in place of the damaged concrete bridge while a new concrete bridge was constructed and opened on 7 June 2019. However, hillside stabilization had yet to be addressed as of November 2018 and this was necessary before major infrastructure work could progress. Bridges remained damaged and only recently begun reconstruction. Additionally, transnational electricity projects are expected to pass through the area, although funding is still a question mark and the Nepali government remains cash-strapped and overburdened with competing projects.

== Bibliography ==
- Chan, Victor (1994), Tibet Handbook, Moon Publications – via archive.org
- Dorje, Gyurme (2004), Footprint Tibet Handbook with Bhutan (3rd ed.), Bath: Footprint Handbooks, ISBN 1-903471-30-3 – via archive.org
- Jackson, David P. (1976), "The early history of Lo (Mustang) and Ngari" (PDF), Contributions to Nepal Studies. Journal of the Institute of Nepal and Asian Studies, 4 (1), Kathmandu: Tribhuvan University: 39–56
