= Naubise =

Naubise नौबिसे
- Village development committee
- Location in Nepal
- Coordinates: 27°43′N 85°09′E
- Country: Nepal
- Zone: Bagmati Zone
- District: Dhading District

Population (2015)
  - Total: 25,000
  - Religions: Hindu
- Time zone: UTC+5:45 (Nepal Time)

Naubise is a Village in Dhading District in the Bagmati Province of central Nepal. At the time of the 2011 Nepal census it had a population of 25621 and had 3239 houses in it.

To Promote local culture Naubise has two FM radio station Radio Rajmarga - 92.1 MHz Which is a Community radio Station and Krishi Radio-101.5 MHz that features agriculture related programs.

During 2015 earthquake in Nepal, the VDC was totally devastated but only 26deaths were caused. To the earthquake victims of this VDC, assistance was provided by LEO club of peace khanikhola, UNICEF, WFP and many other NGOs and INGOs. This VDC is one of the developing VDC in dhading district. The main occupation of people is agriculture-farming, different occupational jobs. Education sector of this VDC in government school is weaker as compare to private school. This vdc has altogether 28 schools among them many student are enrolled in government schools due to the poor financial conditions of marginal communities people.
