= Vijay Subedi =

Nepali politician

Vijay Subedi (Bijay Subedi) is a Nepali politician in Gunjanagar, Western Chitwan District, Nepal. He was a member of provincial assembly in Bagmati Province of Nepal. He was elected from Chitwan 2(B) for the CPN(UML).

== See also ==
- Jagannath Paudel
- Renu Dahal
- KP Sharma Oli
- Communist Party of Nepal (Unified Marxist–Leninist)
