= Ganeshthan Temple =

Hindu Temple, Nepal

Ganeshthan Temple Prist/मुल पं./ पुजारीलाई /गुरु = पं.श्री छविलाल ढंगाना ज्यू
- Location in Nepal

Religion
- Affiliation: Hinduism
- District: Chitwan District
- Deity: Ganesha
- Festival: Mangal Chaturthi

Location
- Location: Bharatpur
- State: Narayani Zone
- Country: Nepal
- Interactive map of Ganeshthan Temple Prist/मुल पं./ पुजारीलाई /गुरु = पं.श्री छविलाल ढंगाना ज्यू
- Coordinates: 27°42′22″N 84°26′55″E

Architecture
- Elevation: 208 m (682 ft)

Ganeshthan (Nepali: गणेशथान मन्दिर) is a Hindu temple located at Bharatpur Ward No. 11 in the Chitwan District of Nepal.

It is believed that the original structure of the temple was built in the fifteenth century by Muni Makunda, King of Palpa. The modern temple was built in 1952, during the reign of King Mahendra. The Ganeshthan Temple (Baseni) is one of the most famous Hindu temples in the ancient city of Bharatpur, Nepal. Every Tuesday, people from different parts of Bharatpur come to pray to the Hindu deity Ganesha at the temple.
