= Chitwan Medical College =

Medical school in Chitwan, Nepal

- चितवन मेडिकल कलेज
- Motto: Commitment to excellence in healthcare education
- Type: Private
- Established: 2006; 20 years ago
- Accreditation: Nepal Medical Council
- Academic affiliation: Tribhuvan University
- Director: Dr. Harish Chandra Neupane
- Management: International Society for Medical Education Pvt. Ltd.
- Location: Bharatpur, Chitwan, Nepal; 27°41′7.49281″N 84°25′51.38465″E
- Campus: Urban
- Website: www.cmc.edu.np

Chitwan Medical College (CMC) is a private medical college located in Bharatpur, Chitwan, Nepal. Established in 2006, the college is affiliated with Tribhuvan University and offers 9 DM/MCh programs, 25 postgraduate programs, and 8 undergraduate programs in medical and health sciences.

== History ==
The college was established in 2006 by the International Society for Medical Education Pvt. Ltd. It started with an initial intake of 80 students per year in the Bachelor of Medicine and Bachelor of Surgery (MBBS) program. Over the years, CMC has expanded its academic offerings to include nursing, pharmacy, public health, and other allied health sciences programs.

== Operations ==
CMC operates a 750-bed teaching hospital located in Bharatpur. The hospital provides a wide range of healthcare services and is equipped with advanced diagnostic and therapeutic facilities. The medical college is affiliated with Tribhuvan University and is recognized by the Nepal Medical Council. The college is committed to offering quality medical education and healthcare services under the management of the International Society for Medical Education Pvt. Ltd....

== Programs ==
The college offers the following programs:

- Bachelor of Medicine and Bachelor of Surgery (MBBS)
- Bachelor of Nursing Sciences (BNS)
- Bachelor of Pharmacy (BPharm)
- Bachelor of Public Health (BPH)
- Post Graduate - MD/MS in various specialties

== Hospital services ==
Chitwan Medical College Teaching Hospital provides the following services:

- Outpatient and Inpatient services
- Emergency and Trauma care
- Intensive Care Units (ICU)
- Neonatal Intensive Care Units (NICU)
- Surgical and Medical services
- Diagnostic services including Laboratory, Radiology (X-rays, CT scans, MRI), and Ultrasonography
- Specialty Clinics and Departments

== Community Involvement and Controversies ==
CMC is actively involved in the local community through its healthcare services and educational outreach. However, the college has faced controversies, including protests by students over additional fees that exceeded government-approved limits. In 2019, students staged protests at the college and in Maitighar, Kathmandu, after the administration did not address their concerns about fee structures. Faculty list of Chitwan Medical College has not been updated for years - this is to give a false impression to allure national as well as international students to join the college (just to get disappointed later).

== Sports Involvement ==
In addition to its academic and medical operations, Chitwan Medical College is actively involved in promoting sports. In 2024, CMC became the owner of the Chitwan Rhinos in the Nepal Premier League (NPL), a major cricket tournament in Nepal. This involvement in the NPL highlights the college's commitment to supporting sports and community engagement beyond the medical field.

== See also ==
- Janaki Medical College
- College of Medical Sciences, Bharatpur
