= 2022 Bharatpur municipal election =

Local election in Nepal

2022 Bharatpur municipal elections
- 13 May 2022

147 seats to Bharatpur Metropolitan City Council 74 seats needed for a majority

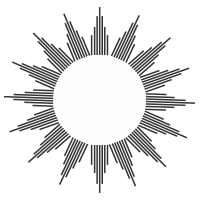

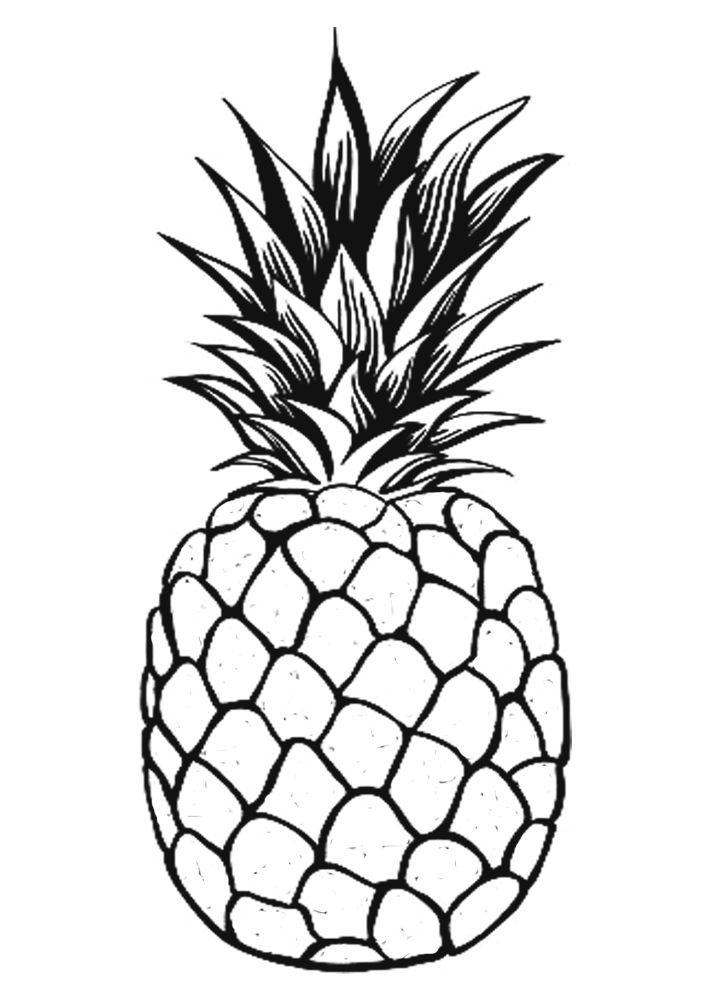

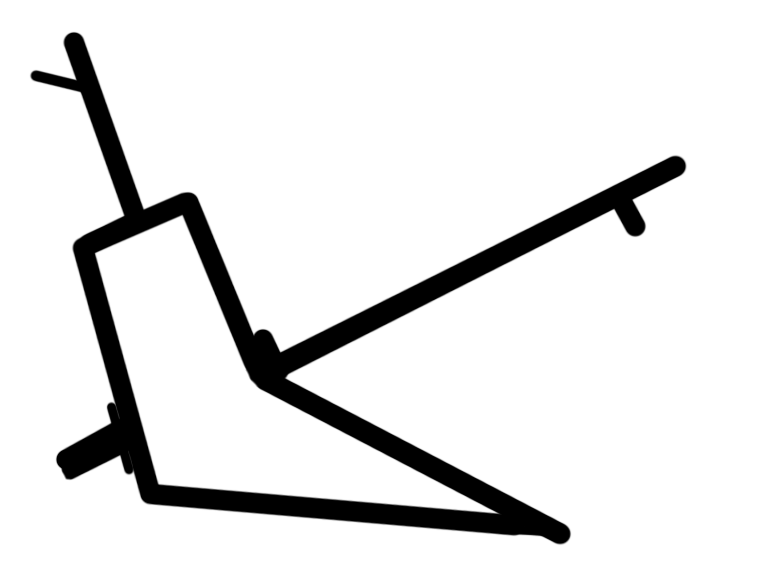
	First party	Second party	Third party
Leader	Renu Dahal	Bijay Subedi	Jagannath Paudel
Party	Maoist Centre	CPN (UML)	Independent
Seats before	8	70	0
Seats won	10	52	1
Seat change	▲2	▼18	▲1
Popular vote	52,028	39,582	14,728
Percentage	48.3%	36.8%	13.7%
	Fourth party	Fifth party	Sixth party
Party	Congress	Unified Socialist	RPP
Seats before	69	0	0
Seats won	75	5	4
Seat change	▲6	▲5	▲4
Mayor before election
Renu Dahal
Maoist Centre
Elected Mayor
Renu Dahal
Maoist Centre

Municipal election for Bharatpur took place on 13 May 2022, with all 147 positions up for election across 29 wards. The electorate elected a mayor, a deputy mayor, 29 ward chairs and 116 ward members. An indirect election will also be held to elect five female members and an additional three female members from the Dalit and minority community to the municipal executive.

Renu Dahal of CPN (Maoist Centre) was re-elected as mayor winning 48.3% of the votes and Nepali Congress gained control of the council.

== Background ==
Bharatpur was established in 1978 as a municipality. The municipality was upgraded to a sub-metropolitan city in 2014 after incorporating neighboring village development committees into Bharatpur municipality. The metropolitan city was created in 2017 after incorporating Narayani municipality, Chitraban municipality and Kalibas VDC into Bharatpur sub-metropolitan city. Electors in each ward elect a ward chair and four ward members, out of which two must be female and one of the two must belong to the Dalit community.

In the previous election, Renu Dahal from CPN (Maoist Centre) was elected as the first mayor of the metropolitan city.

== Candidates ==
=== Jagannath Paudel ===
A veteran Nepali Congress politician and advocate Paudel is an independent mayoral candidate. Behind Poudel is a team of former presidents of Chitwan Congress Krishnalal Sapkota and Tikaram Neupane, former district secretary Anand Raj Raut, former MP Bhim Bahadur Shrestha, leader Meena Kharel, former president of Tarun Dal Shambhu Aryal and others. Paudel has previously served as deputy mayor of Bharatpur winning election in 2054 BS. He's even served as member of National Assembly. Currently, Election Commission has given him pineapple election symbol.

Paudel is one the founder of community campus, Balkumari Campus of Bharatpur. Similarly, Paudel has been involving in various social welfare activities.

He's been a threat to both CPN (Maoist Centre) and CPN (UML) candidate while Nepali Congress had obtained the highest wardwise vote in previous elections.

=== Renu Dahal ===
Dahal, a former mayor of Bharatpur is running in the election even this time from CPN (Maoist Centre). Dahal is the daughter of Pushpa Kamal Dahal. Dahal had won 2017 election with the help of Nepali Congress.

=== Bijay Subedi ===
Subedi, a former member of Provincial Assembly of Bagmati Province is the mayoral candidate from CPN (UML). He was put forward by Devi Gyawali who had lost previous elections by a very small margin.

=== List of Mayor and deputy mayor candidates ===
Party	Mayor candidate	Deputy Mayor candidate
Nepali Congress		Chitrasen Adhikari
CPN (Unified Marxist–Leninist)	Bijay Subedi	
CPN (Maoist Centre)	Renu Dahal	
Rastriya Prajatantra Party		Himali Gurung
Dissident Nepali Congress	Jagannath Paudel	

== Surveys and opinion polls ==
Date	News agency	Sample size	Renu Dahal	Bijay Subedi	Jagannath Paudel	Undecided	Result
8 May 2022	Setopati	242	66	57	23	97	Hung
8 May 2022	Setopati	242	27%	23%	9%	41%	Hung

National level news agency, Setopati conducted opinion poll among 242 people of Bharatpur of different areas which gave a conclusion that majority Nepali Congress voters were undecided. Some of them were campaigning for Renu Dahal but we're determined to vote Jagannath Paudel during vote to be safe from party expel. Few people who had voted Renu Dahal last time were thinking to vote Jagannath this time. Few voters criticized Puspa Kamal Dahal's statement of accident in country again if his daughter Renu lost the election.

Similarly, all the voters of CPN (UML)-RPP alliance were determined to vote their own candidate. This brought a conclusion that even CPN (UML) could vote Jagannath Paudel in contrition that they were sure of themself not to win. Similarly, there was effect in CPN (UML) vote after party split under leadership of Madhav Nepal.

== Exit polls ==
Date	Pollster	Dahal	Subedi	Paudel	Others	Lead
Date	Pollster	Maoist	UML	Ind	Others	Lead
13 May 2022	Facts Nepal	41.4%	29.9%	19.8%	8.9%	11.5%

== Results ==
=== Mayoral election ===
Mayoral elections result
Party	Candidate	Votes	%	±%
Maoist Centre	Renu Dahal	52,028	48.3%	+2.8%
CPN (UML)	Bijay Subedi	39,582	36.8%	−8.5%
Independent	Jagannath Paudel	14,728	13.7%	New
Others		1,311	1.2%	
Total valid votes		107,649	100.0%	
Rejected ballots		20,190		
Turnout		127,839		
Registered electors		185,752		
Maoist Centre hold				

Deputy mayoral elections result
Party	Candidate	Votes	%	±%
Congress	Chitrasen Adhikari	52,803	62.2%	+12.6%
RPP	Himala Gurung	30,611	36.1%	+28.5%
Others		1,471	1.7%	
Total valid votes		84,885	100.0%	
Rejected ballots		42,954		
Turnout		127,839		
Registered electors		185,752		
Congress hold				

== Ward results ==
Results of ward chair by party

Summary of Partywise Ward chairman and Ward member seats won, 2022
Party	Chairman	Members
Nepali Congress	16	58
CPN (Unified Marxist-Leninist)	6	46
CPN (Maoist Centre)	3	6
CPN (Unified Socialist)	3	2
Rastriya Prajatantra Party	0	4
Independent	1	0
Total	29	116

=== Summary of ward results ===
Ward No.	Ward Chair	Ward Members			
Ward No.	Ward Chair	Open	Open 2	Female	Female Dalit
1	Keshav Maharjan				
2	Manoj Ranabhat				
3	Bikas Thapa				
4	Arpan Pokharel				
5	Yuddha Prasad Shrestha				
6	Krishna Lal Shrestha				
7	Rajendra Mani Kafle				
8	Jeevan Nath Kadel				
9	Yam Lal Kadel				
10	Parmeshwar Khanal				
11	Kamal Bahadur Malla				
12	Lekh Raj Pant				
13	Prakash Dawadi				
14	Rajendra Sakhi				
15	Shree Krishna Devkota				
16	Amrit Raj Hamal				
17	Lalit Man Tamang				
18	Babu Ram Rana Magar				
19	Prakash Tamang				
20	Mukti Prasad Ghale				
21	Krishna Kumar Gurung				
22	Bishnu Raj Mahato				
23	Dipak Dawadi				
24	Ram Bahadur Godar				
25	Chhabilal Sapkota				
26	Gyan Prasad Khanal				
27	Ram Bahadur Bhandari				
28	Danda Pani Rijal				
29	Surya Bahadur Gurung				

== Results for municipal executive election ==
The municipal executive consists of the mayor, who is also the chair of the municipal executive, the deputy mayor and ward chairs from each ward. The members of the municipal assembly will elect five female members and three members from the Dalit and minority community to the municipal executive.

=== Municipal Assembly composition ===
Party	Members
Nepali Congress	75
CPN (Unified Marxist–Leninist)	52
CPN (Maoist Centre)	10
CPN (Unified Socialist)	5
Rastriya Prajatantra Party	4
Independent	1
Total	147

=== Results ===
Category	Candidate	Party	Votes
Female Member	Sirjana Adhikari	Nepali Congress	91
Female Member	Sukmaya B.K.	Nepali Congress	89
Female Member	Sharada Pokharel	Nepali Congress	87
Female Member	Narbada Sapkota	Nepali Congress	86
Female Member	Bina Nepali	CPN (Maoist Centre)	86
Dalit/Minority Member	Gopal Darai	Nepali Congress	97
Dalit/Minority Member	Kopila Uparkoti	CPN (Unified Socialist)	92
Dalit/Minority Member	Bishnu Bahadur Bhujel	CPN (Maoist Centre)	86

=== Municipal Executive composition ===
Party	Members
Nepali Congress	22
CPN (Unified Marxist–Leninist)	6
CPN (Maoist Centre)	6
CPN (Unified Socialist)	4
Independent	1
Total	39

== See also ==
- 2022 Nepalese local elections
- 2022 Lalitpur municipal election
- 2022 Kathmandu municipal election
- 2022 Janakpur municipal election
- 2022 Pokhara municipal election
