= Renu Dahal =

Nepali politician

- रेणु दाहाल
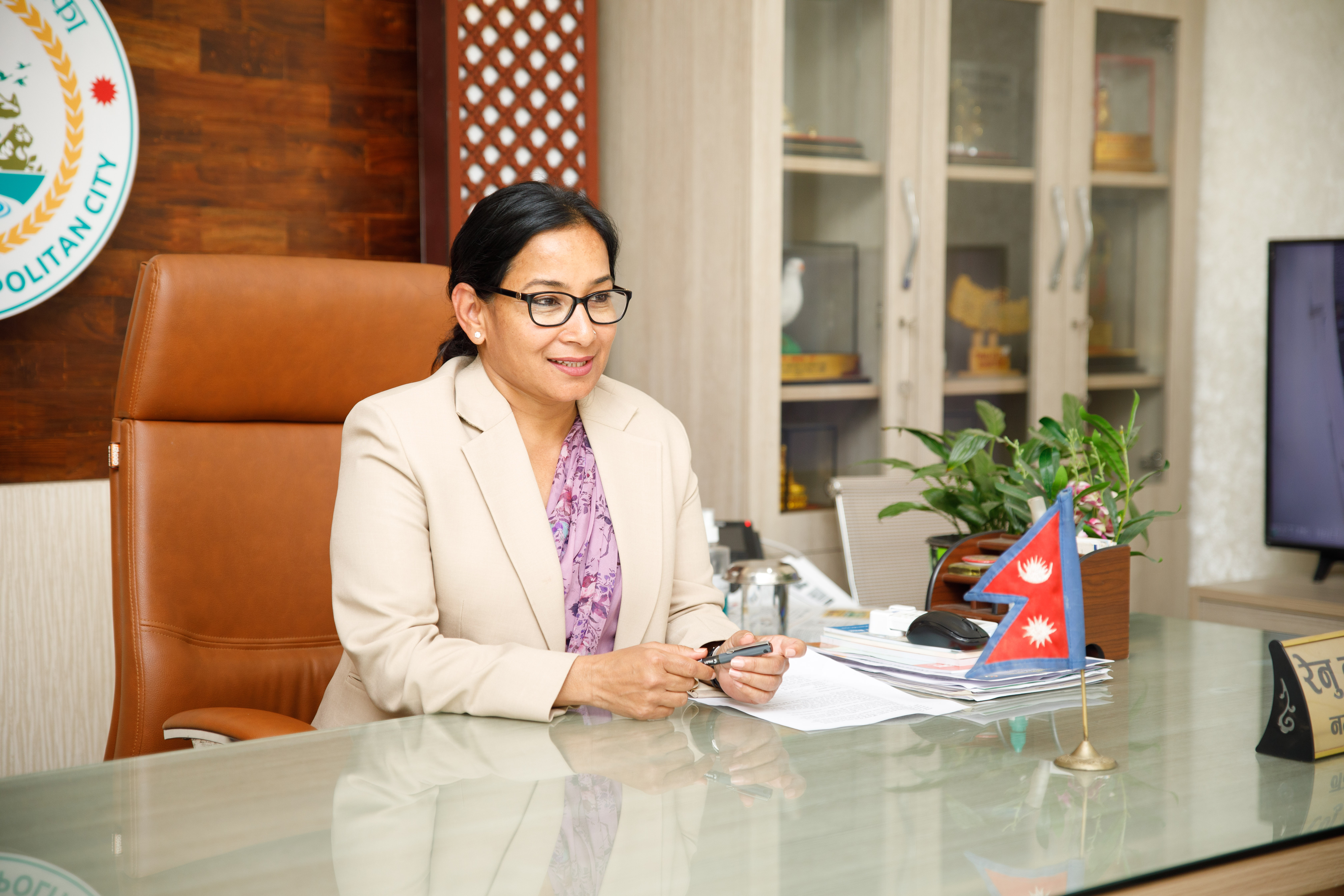
- Renu Dahal In office

Ex Mayor of Bharatpur Metropolitan City
- In office 25 May 2022 – 20 January 2026
- Deputy: Chitrasen Adhikari
- Preceded by: Renu Dahal
- Succeeded by: Chitrasen Adhikari
- In office 5 August 2017 – 22 April 2022
- Deputy: Parbati Shah Thakuri
- Succeeded by: Renu Dahal

Constituent Assembly Member (PR)
- In office 28 May 2008 – 27 May 2012

Personal details
- Born: 4 July 1976 (age 50) Shivanagar, Chitwan, Nepal
- Party: Nepali Communist Party
- Spouse: Arjun Pathak
- Children: 2
- Parents: Pushpa Kamal Dahal (father); Sita Dahal (mother)

Renu Dahal (Nepali: रेणु दाहाल) is a Nepalese politician and former mayor of Bharatpur Metropolitan City. She joined the CPN (Maoist Centre) party in 1994 and became a full-time member of the party in 1996. Dahal is a daughter of the former prime minister and chairman of CPN (MC), Pushpa Kamal Dahal. She was a member (Proportional Representation) of First Constituent Assembly of Nepal.

She resigned as the mayor of Bharatpur on 20 January 2026 in order to contest 2026 Nepalese general election from Chitwan 3 parliamentary constituency on a Nepal Communist Party election ticket.

== Early life ==
Renu Dahal was born on July 4, 1976, in Bhimsen Nagar of Shivanagar VDC (now Bharatpur Metropolis) in Chitwan District. She is the second daughter of Pushpa Kamal Dahal (née Prachanda) and Sita Dahal. Dahal has a younger sister, Ganga. Her eldest sister, Gyanu, died of breast cancer in 2014 and her only brother, Prakash, died of a cardiac arrest in 2017.

== CA election ==
=== 2013 Constituent Assembly election ===
Kathmandu 1
Party	Candidate	Votes
Nepali Congress	Prakash Man Singh	15,138
CPN (Maoist Centre)	Renu Dahal	4,064
Rastriya Prajatantra Party Nepal	Bharat Mani Jangam	3,732
CPN (Unified Marxist-Leninist)	Bidhya Neupane	3,501
Others		2,499
Result	Congress hold	
Source: Election Commission

== 2017 Bharatpur municipal election ==
=== 2017 election ===
In 2017, Renu Dahal won the mayorship with 43,127 votes against Devi Prasad Gyawali of the UML, who received 42,924 votes. However, her victory was highly controversial.

Reportedly, some ballot papers were torn when the then Chief Election Officer, Kabi Prasad Neupane, went to the toilet while the votes were being counted. After that, the then UML mayoral candidate, Gyawali, claimed that the ballot papers were torn in a planned manner after the Maoists were sure to lose.

There was a dispute in the counting of votes, stating that the ink of the swastika on the ballot paper was smeared excessively and was to be declared null and void. However, the case reached the court through the Election Commission. After that, it was ordered that there would be a re-election in ward 19 of the Bharatpur metropolis. Renu Dahal won the election by 203 votes.

2017 Nepalese local elections
Party	Candidate	Votes	Status
MC	Renu Dahal	43,127	Elected
UML	Devi Gyawali	42,924	Lost

== 2022 Bharatpur municipal elections ==
The CPN (Maoist Centre) nominated Renu Dahal, daughter of party chairman Pushpa Kamal Dahal, as its mayoral candidate in Bharatpur.

During an election program in Bharatpur, Pushpa Kamal Dahal stated that the country would face disaster if Nepali Congress supporters did not vote for the Maoist election symbol. In his speech, he remarked: "Let me warn you that if the NC supporters do not vote for the Maoist candidate in Bharatpur this time, there is a possibility that the country could plunge into an accident.”

The statement was widely criticized both within and outside Dahal's party. Ganesh Sah, a senior leader of the CPN (Maoist Centre), said that there was no culture of collective leadership in the party and that it was well known why Prachanda was particularly focused on Bharatpur. Other senior leaders, including Anjana Bisankhe and Indra Bahadur Angbo, also criticized the chairman’s strong involvement in Bharatpur, noting that it was the constituency of both him and his daughter.

Similarly, Jagannath Paudel, a Nepali Congress leader who contested as an independent mayoral candidate, claimed that Dahal’s speech had strengthened his own prospects and that no alliance could prevent his victory. It was also predicted that some Nepali Congress supporters would internally back Paudel against Dahal.

=== 2022 election ===
2022 Bharatpur municipal election
Party	Candidate	Votes	Status
Nepali Congress (Independent)	Jagannath Paudel	14,728	
Maoist Centre	Renu Dahal	52,030	Elected
CPN (UML)	Bijay Subedi	39,581	

== See also ==
- Bijay Subedi
- Jagannath Paudel
