= Gunjanagar =

Gunjanagar गुञ्जनगर
- Location in Nepal
- Coordinates: 27.65°N 84.30°E
- Country: Nepal
- Province: Bagmati Province
- District: Chitwan District

Population (1991)
  - Total: 11,076
- Time zone: UTC+5:45 (Nepal Time)
- Postal code: 44200

Gunjanagar is a town in Bharatpur, Chitwan in Bagmati Province of southern Nepal. The former Gunjanagar VDC and Saradanagar VDC were merged on 18 May 2014 to form new Chitrawan Municipality, which later was merged with Bharatpur. At the time of the 1991 Nepal census it had a population of 11,076 people living in 2025 individual households.

It is an agricultural area located in the western part of Chitwan District and is about 161 km southwest of Kathmandu, the capital of Nepal. This village is situated in about 15 km west of Bharatpur Municipality (Mishra PN, Ghimire TR. Intestinal Parasites and Haemoglobin Concentration in the people of two different Areas of Nepal. Journal of Nepal Health Research Council. 2005). It is surrounded by the Sharadanagar VDC in the east, Shukranagar VDC in the south and Dibyanagar VDC in the west and Narayani River in the north (Mishra PN, Ghimire TR. Intestinal Parasites and Haemoglobin Concentration in the people of two different Areas of Nepal. Journal of Nepal Health Research Council 2005). The major schools in Gunjanagar are Gunjanagar Higher Secondary School and Vimnagar Higher Secondary School. Laligurans, Himalayan, Janapratiban are private schools. There is a Sanskrit School in the Ram Mandir area, Gunjanagar ward number 2 nearby Ward Office (Currently Bharatpur Municipality Ward Number 18). Influential politicians of Gunjanagar are Tek Bahadur Ghale, Bishnu Bilas Dhakal, Dilip Kumar (DK) Shahi, and others. The village is ethnically diverse and rich. Bahun (eg, Ghimire), Chhetri, Gurung (eg, Ghale), Tamang (eg, Lama), Newar (eg, Shrestha) are the major groups in the village. Historically, people from Lamjung, Tanahu, and Gorkha came to this village as migrant and permanent residents. Later people from other districts like Syangja, Baglung, Parbat migrated there for a living. Historically, geographically, politically, and economically, Gunjanagar is one of the more important areas in central Nepal.
