= B. P. Koirala Memorial Cancer Hospital =

B.P. Koirala Memorial Cancer Hospital

Geography
- Location: Chitwan, Nepal
- Coordinates: 27.663716°N 84.418733°E

Organisation
- Type: Specialist / Teaching

History
- Founded: 29 December 1994

Links
- Website: www.bpkmch.org.np
- Lists: Hospitals in Nepal

B.P. Koirala Memorial Cancer Hospital (BPKMCH) is a tertiary cancer hospital located outside the Kathmandu Valley in Bharatpur, Chitwan District, Nepal.

The hospital is named in honor of Bishweshwar Prasad Koirala, the first democratically elected Prime Minister of Nepal who died of throat cancer in 1982.

In 1995, it began offering day services and in 1999 began treating inpatients. The hospital was funded equally by China and Nepal, with China sending doctors and other personnel to help train staff for the new facility. BP Koirala Memorial Cancer Hospital is planning to expand services in all seven provinces of Nepal. Nepalese Journal of Cancer (NJC) is the official journal of the BPKMCH.
