= Chitrawan Municipality =

Chitrawan Municipality चित्रवन नगरपालिका
- Municipality
- Location in Nepal
- Coordinates: 27.65°N 84.30°E
- Country: Nepal
- Province: Bagmati Province
- District: Chitwan District

Population (2011)
  - Total: 26,579
- Time zone: UTC+5:45 (NST)

Chitrawan Municipality is a former Municipality in Chitwan District, now a part of Bharatpur Metropolitan City in Bagmati Province of southern Nepal. The Municipality was established on 18 May 2014 by merging formerly Gunjanagar, Saradanagar and Dibyanagar village development committee. At the time of the 2011 Nepal census, it had a population of 26,579 people living in 2025 individual households. The total population is 34,913 (CBS 2011). The total area is 54.9 km^{2} (Gunjanagar - 22.77 km^{2}, Sharadanagar - 13.54 km^{2} & Dibyanagar - 18.59 km^{2}).
