= Narayani Bridge =

Narayani Bridge (नारायणी पुल)
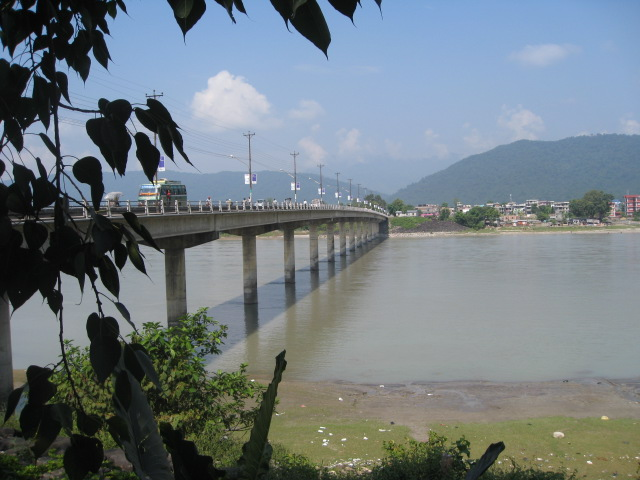
- Narayani Bridge seen from Narayangarh
- Coordinates: 27°41′58″N 84°25′08″E
- Crosses: Narayani River
- Locale: Nepal Narayangarh, Chitwan & Gaidakot, Nawalparasi

Characteristics
- Total length: 420m

History
- Opened: 1980s

Narayani Bridge (Nepali: नारायणी पुल) is a bridge on the east–west (Mahendra highway) of Nepal located in the central region of Nepal. The bridge connects Gaindakot municipality of Nawalparasi District on the western region of Nepal, with Narayanghat (Bharatpur, Nepal) city on the central development region. Built in the early 1980s, the bridge is roughly 420 m (1,380 ft) long and is considered one of the most important commercial travel routes in the country due to its passage over the Narayani River. It has 15 large and round shaped pillars.
