= Jagannath Paudel =

Nepali politician

Honourable Jagannath Paudel
- जगन्नाथ पौडेल
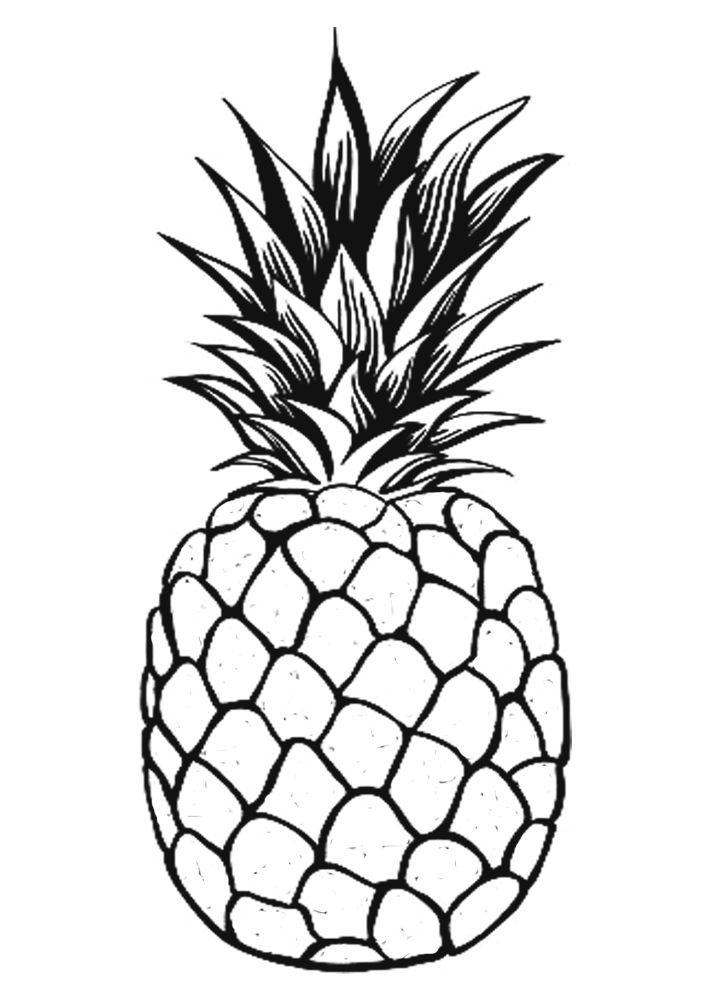
- Election symbol of Paudel

Member of Rastriya Sabha
- In office 1997–2002
- Prime Minister: KP Sharma Oli
- Constituency: Bagmati Province

Deputy Mayor of Bharatpur Municipality
- In office 1992–1997
- Monarch: Birendra of Nepal
- Prime Minister: Krishna Prasad Bhattarai

Personal details
- Party: Nepali Congress
- Occupation: Lawyer; Politician

Jagannath Paudel (Nepali: जगन्नाथ पौडेल) is a Nepali politician who is a member of the Nepali Congress. He is also a former member of Rastriya Sabha and was elected under the open category.

He was one of the core leader of Nepali Congress in Bharatpur until he gave independent candidacy against the alliance. Currently, even CPN (UML) and RPP are in talks with Paudel to vote him instead of their own candidate to make Renu Dahal loose the election. Similarly, nearly seventy percent of the Nepali Congress vote is expected to be cast for Paudel. Due to this Paudel has been a matter of pressure to both UML and Maoist candidate with highest chance of win.

== Political life ==
Paudel is the former elected deputy mayor of Bharatpur. He has served as member of National Assembly. A veteran politician, Paudel is one of the most popular politicians in Bharatpur.

=== 2022 Bharatpur municipal election ===
On the eve of the 2022 Bharatpur municipal election, Paudel announced his independent candidacy against Renu Dahal, the candidate of the governing alliance. He did so against the party's decision, after consulting local party committees that urged him to run so that they could vote for their own candidate rather than Dahal for mayor.

Prime Minister and many other top leaders asked him to visit Kathmandu at least once to discuss the topic. Deuba had sent the two ministers to Chitwan on Wednesday to convince rebel candidate Paudel to withdraw candidacy and support CPN (Maoist Center) candidate Renu Dahal, but to no avail. Paudel on the other hand didn't accepted to take back his candidacy even when Home minister Bal Krishna Khand and minister Umesh Shrestha went to Bharatpur to ask him to take back his candidacy for other post to be given to him. Currently, Poudel has got pineapple election symbol.

Behind Poudel is a team of former presidents of Chitwan Congress Krishna Lal Sapkota and Tikaram Neupane, former MP Bhim Bahadur Shrestha, former district secretary Anand Raj Raut, leader Meena Kharel, former president of Nepal Tarun Dal Shambhu Prasad Aryal and others. Similarly, Nepali Congress (BP) and five other parties have given support to Paudel.

== Social works ==
Paudel is one the founder of community campus, Balkumari Campus of Bharatpur. Similarly, Paudel has been involving in various social welfare activities.

== See also ==
- Nepali Congress
- 2022 Bharatpur municipal election
