= Shivanagar, Chitwan =

Shivanagar शिवनगर
- Village development committee
- Location in Nepal
- Coordinates: 27.62°N 84.37°E
- Country: Nepal
- Zone: Narayani Zone
- District: Chitwan District

Population (1991)
  - Total: 6,937
- Time zone: UTC+5:45 (Nepal Time)

Shivanagar was a village development committee in Chitwan District in the Narayani Zone of southern Nepal. At the time of the 1991 Nepal census it had a population of 6,937 people living in 1,314 individual households.

1. Shivanagar was the Village Development Committee (VDC), under Chitwan district of Nepal. Now, the VDC is divided in different ward authority of the Bharatpur Metropolitan City. Most regions are under Ward number-14 of Bharatpur metropolitan City.
