= Saradanagar =

Sharadanagar शारदानगर
- Location in Nepal
- Coordinates: 27.64°N 84.34°E
- Country: Nepal
- Province: Bagmati Province
- District: Chitwan District

Population (1991)
  - Total: 7,133
- Time zone: UTC+5:45 (Nepal Time)

Saradanagar (Nepali: शारदानगर) is a town in Bharatpur Metropolitan City in Chitwan District in the Bagmati Province of Nepal. The formerly Village Development Committee was merged to form new municipality, Chitrawan Municipality on 18 May 2014 by merging formerly Gunjanagar and Saradanagar village development committee, which was later merged under Bharatpur Metropolitan. At the time of the 1991 Nepal census it had a population of 7133 people living in 1334 individual households.
