= Journal of Nepal Health Research Council =

- Discipline: Medicine, medical education, public health
- Language: English
- Edited by: Rajeev Shrestha

Publication details
- History: 2003–present
- Publisher: Nepal Health Research Council (Nepal)
- Frequency: Quarterly
- Open access: Yes
- License: CC BY-NC 4.0

Standard abbreviations
- ISO 4: J. Nepal Health Res. Counc.

Indexing
- ISSN: 1727-5482 (print); 1999-6217 (web)
- LCCN: 2004331822
- OCLC no.: 644273209

Links
- Journal homepage; Online access; Online archive

The Journal of Nepal Health Research Council is a quarterly peer-reviewed open-access medical journal covering all aspects of medicine, medical education, and public health. It was established in 2003 and is published by the Nepal Health Research Council. The editor-in-chief is Rajeev Shrestha (Kathmandu University School of Medical Sciences).

== Abstracting and indexing ==
The journal is abstracted and indexed in the Directory of Open Access Journals, EBSCO databases, Index Medicus/MEDLINE/PubMed, and Scopus.
