= College of Medical Sciences, Bharatpur =

- Type: Private Medical College
- Established: 1996; 30 years ago
- Affiliations: Kathmandu University
- Location: Bharatpur, Chitwan (Dist.), Nepal
- Website: https://cmsnepal.edu.np/

The College of Medical Sciences is a medical school in Bharatpur, Chitwan, Nepal.

It conducts the following programs:

- MBBS (Bachelor of Medicine & Bachelor of Surgery)
- BDS (Bachelor of Dental Surgery)
- B.Sc (Nursing)
- MD/MS (Pre-clinical & Clinical sciences)
- DM/M.Ch (Gastroenterology, Cardiology, Neurology, Nephrology, Cardiothoracic & Vascular Surgery, Neurosurgery, Urology, GI Surgery)

== History ==
The duration of the MBBS program is 4 1/2 five and a half years This includes one year of Compulsory Rotatory clinical internship Program. The first two years consists of learning basic science courses, where special emphasis is laid on problem-based and community-oriented learning. In the ensuing two and a half years, the medical students are taught and trained in clinical disciples. The students complete a year of clinical internship in clinical departments as well as in remote outreach health centers before the final medical diploma is issued by the university.

With the modern concept of globalization of medical education as well as hospital care of the patients, the College of Medical Sciences has endeavored to educate the undergraduates with the objective of producing medical personnel of high quality. This institution being premiere medical college in the heart of Nepal; besides having very eminent and experienced faculty who are endowed with international fame indulge with a curriculum which is student centered and has learning objectives of wide ranges of subjects. The curriculum is horizontally and vertically integrated and passive lectures are meager. Problem based learning is emphasized and encouraged among the students. Today, the medical college boasts of a highly qualified and experienced faculty mostly from neighboring countries and already five batches have passed out and there are now four batches of students on the rolls from various regions of Nepal, India and SAARC countries.

A landmark, in the history of the College of Medical Sciences was the inauguration of the teaching hospital on 21 January 1999 by the Managing Director Shri Nagender Pampati. This has revolutionized the healthcare scenario in this region with a combination of clinical expertise and advanced diagnostic facilities. The first Medical Superintendent of the Teaching Hospital was Prof. G. Thippana, M.D., followed by Prof. B. N. Patowary, M.S., the Head of the Department of Surgery. Links have already been established with the Royal College of Physicians, Edinburgh and some of the American Colleges for enhancing the training and service programmes in the college. Further collaborative efforts with International Universities are underway for the purpose of academic co-operation in the teaching of undergraduate and post graduate medical students.
