= Bishazari Tal =

- Nepali: बिसहजारी ताल
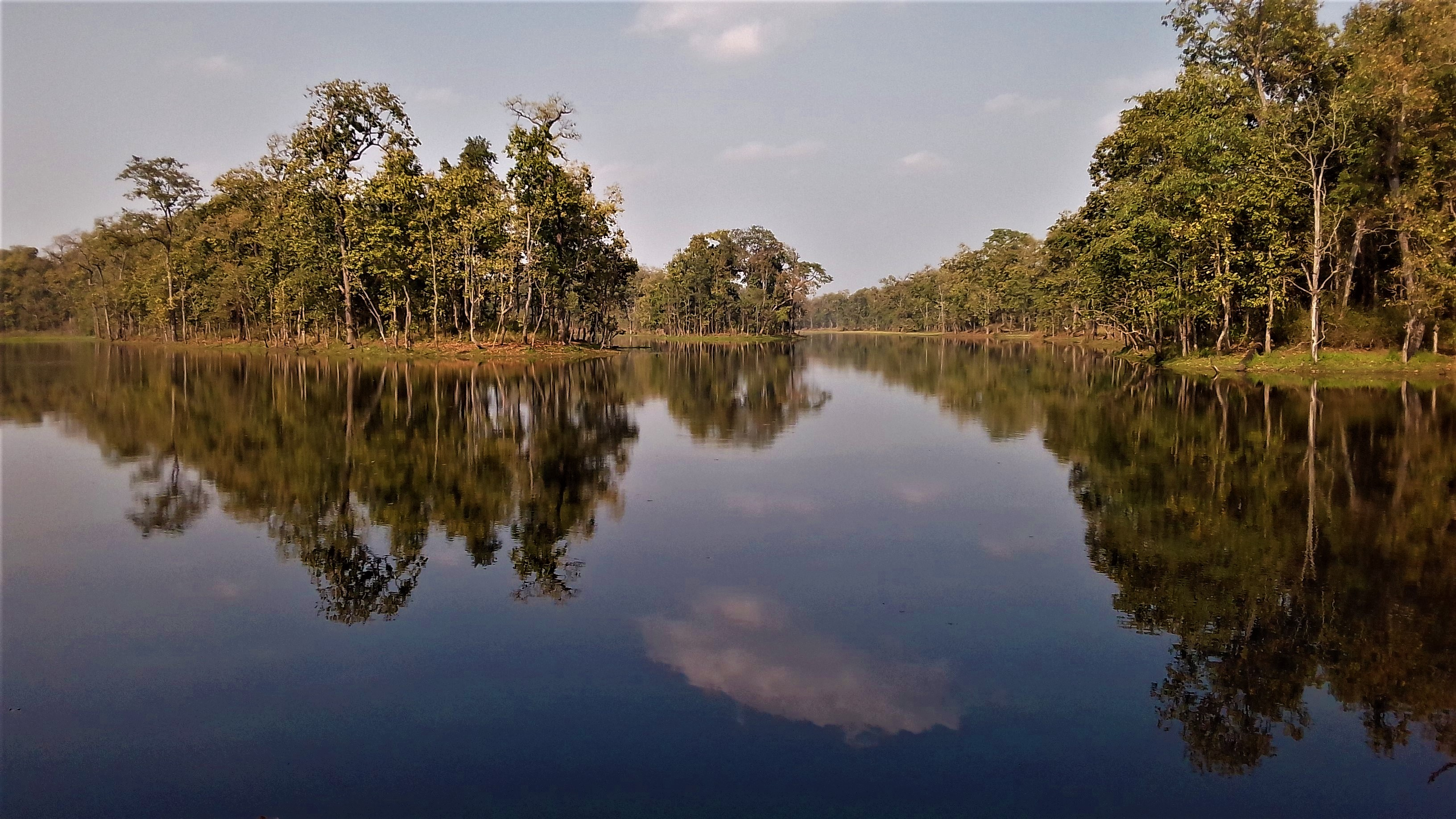
- Bishazari Tal in 2019

- Location within Bagmati Province Location within Nepal Location within South Asia
- Location: Chitwan, Nepal
- Coordinates: 27°37′05″N 84°26′11″E
- Lake type: oxbow lake
- Basin countries: Nepal
- Surface area: 32 km^{2} (12 sq mi)
- Surface elevation: 286 m (938 ft)
- Settlements: Salyantar

Ramsar Wetland
- Official name: Beeshazar and Associated Lakes
- Designated: 13 August 2003
- Reference no.: 1313

Bishazari Tal (Nepali: बिसहजारी ताल), also spelled Beeshazar Tal, is an extensive oxbow lake system in the buffer zone of the Chitwan National Park, a protected area in the Inner Terai of central Nepal. This wetland covers an area of 32 km^{2} (12 sq mi) at an elevation of 286 m (938 ft). The Mahabharat mountain range (Lower Himalayan Range) is located north of the lake, which is itself north of the Siwalik Hills. In August 2003, it has been designated as a Ramsar site.

The Nepali words 'bis' बिस् (twenty), 'hajār' हजार् (thousand) and 'tāl' ताल् (lake) mean '20,000 lakes'.

== Fauna ==
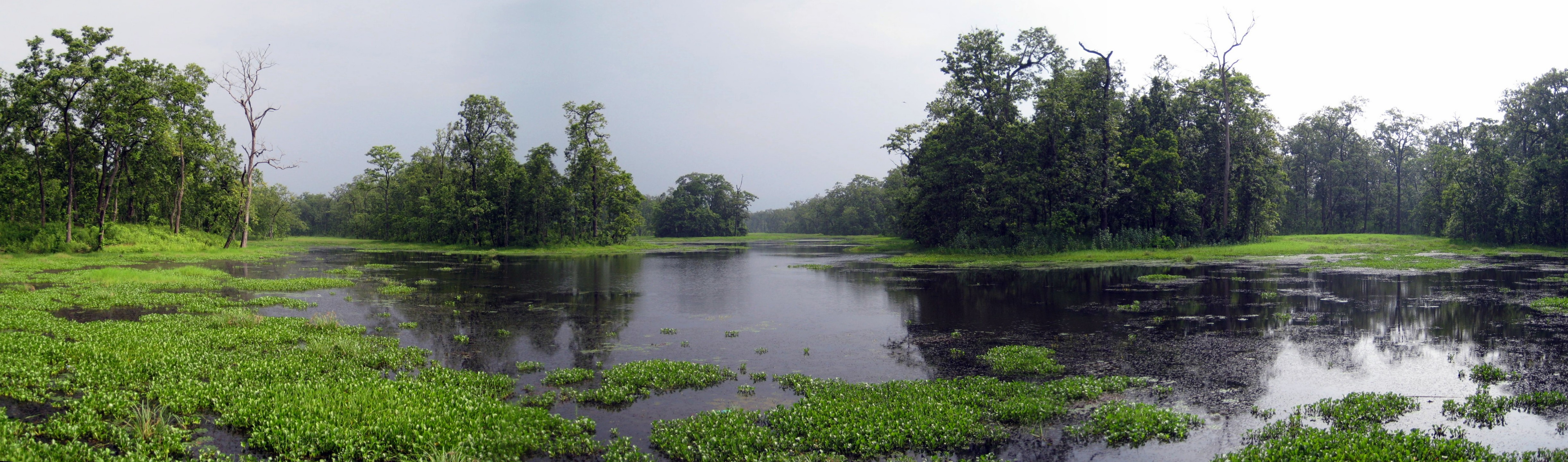
A panoramic view of Bishazari Tal

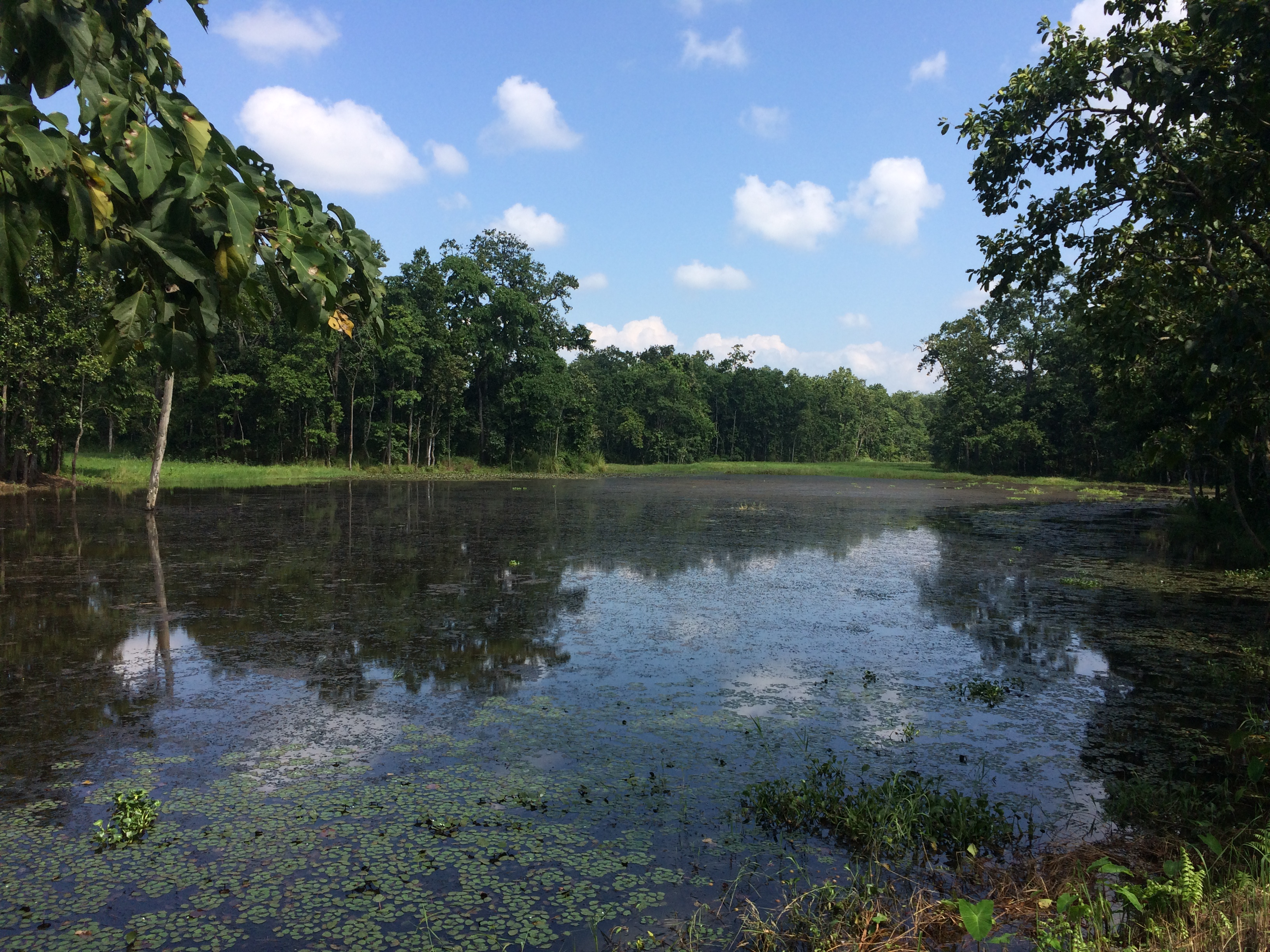
A view of Bishazari Tal during the month of October

The forested wetland provides habitat as a waterhole and wildlife corridor for several wildlife species that includes mammals, birds and reptiles. The forested wetland provides habitat to several mammals that includes Bengal tiger (Panthera tigris tigris), Sloth bear, Smooth-coated otter, one-horned rhinoceros (Rhinoceros unicornis), Wild boar (Sus scrofa) and Indian porcupine (Hystrix indicus). Along with mammals the wetland hosts Indian peafowl (Pavo Cristatus), white-rumped vulture, Pallas's fish-eagle, lesser adjutant, and ferruginous duck. The reptiles that are found here includes Indian rock python (Python molurus), King cobra (Ophiohagus hannah) and Mugger crocodile (Crocodylus palustris).

== See also ==
- List of lakes of Nepal
