= Bharatpur, Nepal =

Metropolitan City in Bagmati Province, Nepal

Bharatpur भरतपुर
- Metropolitan City
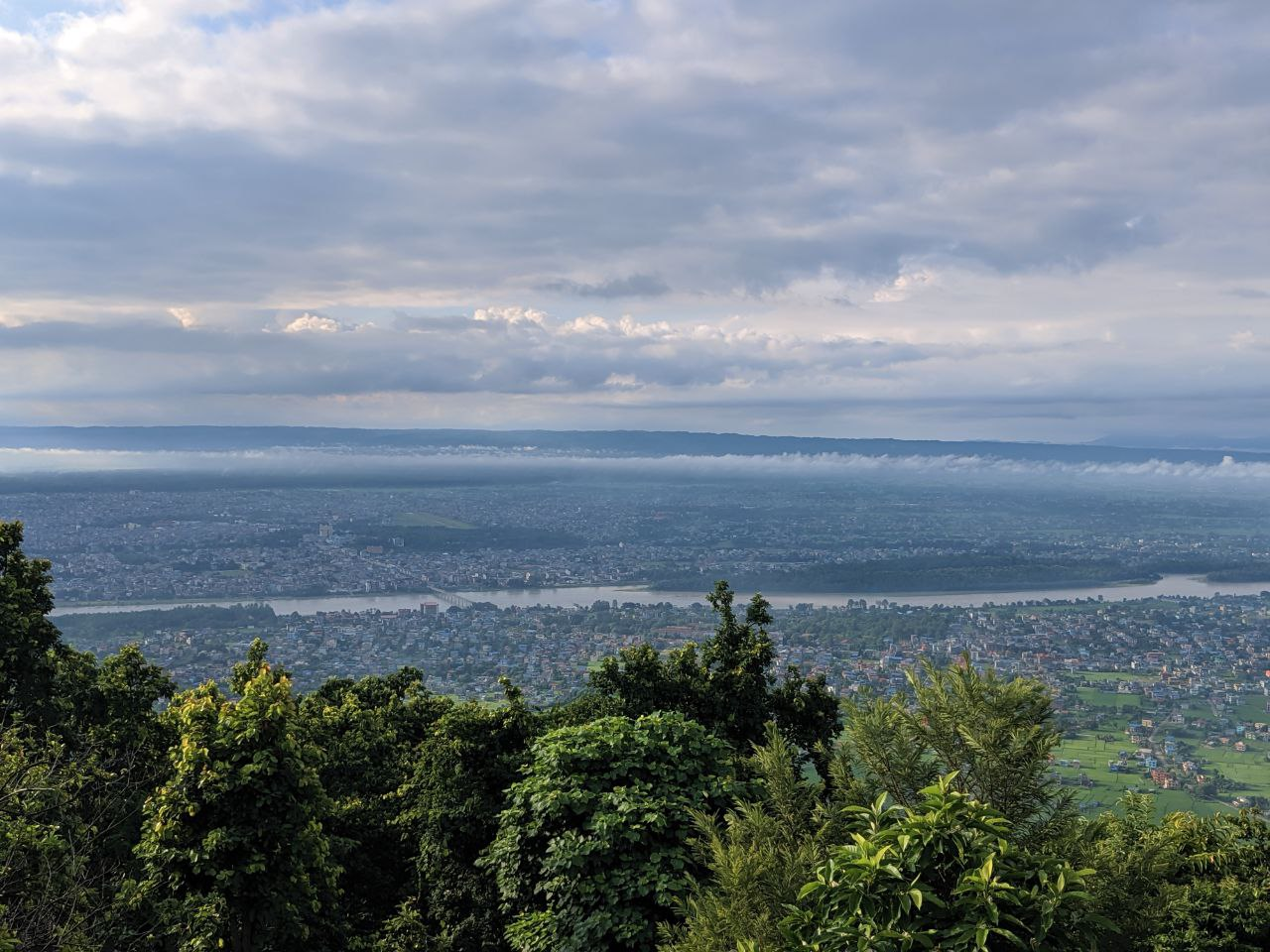
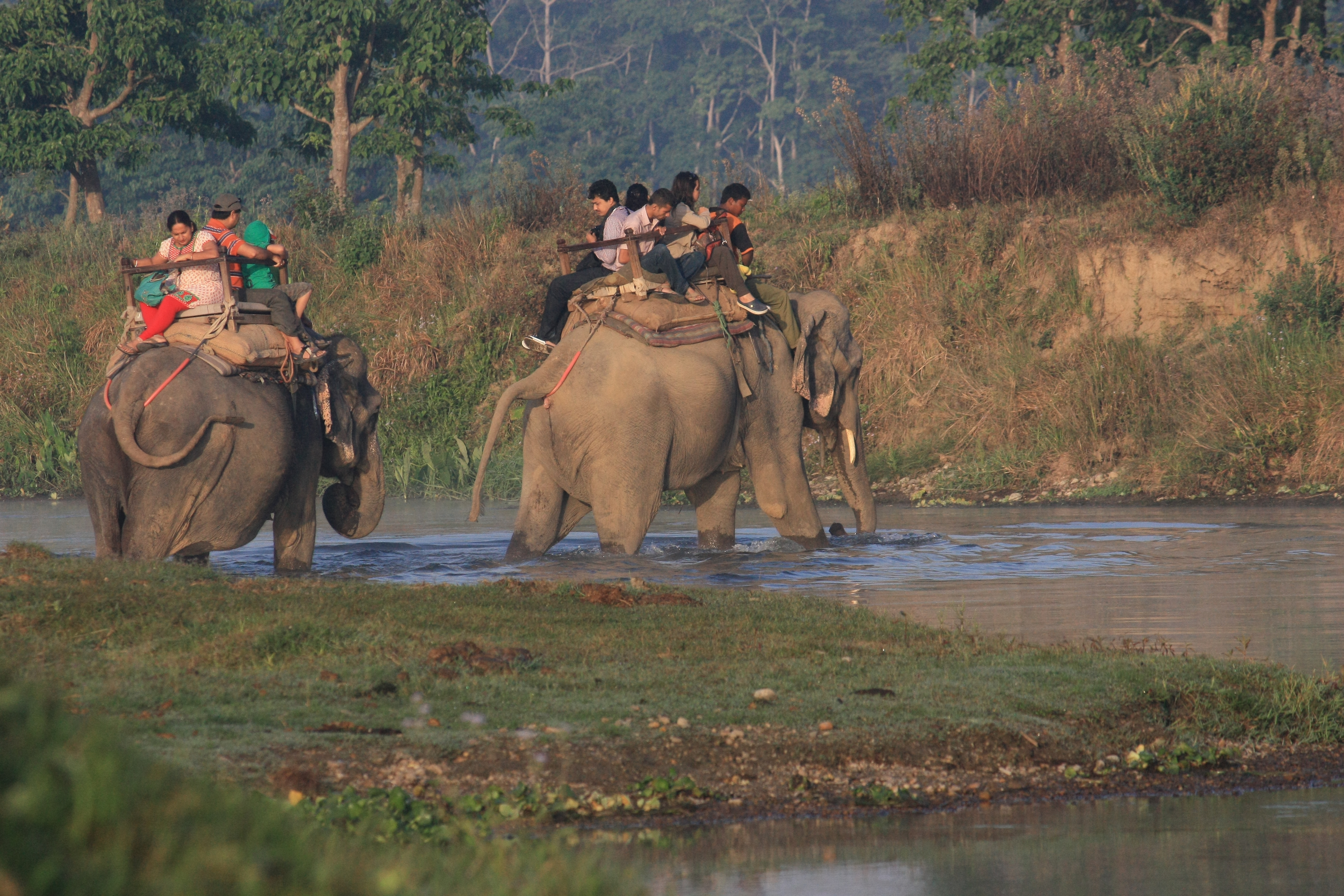
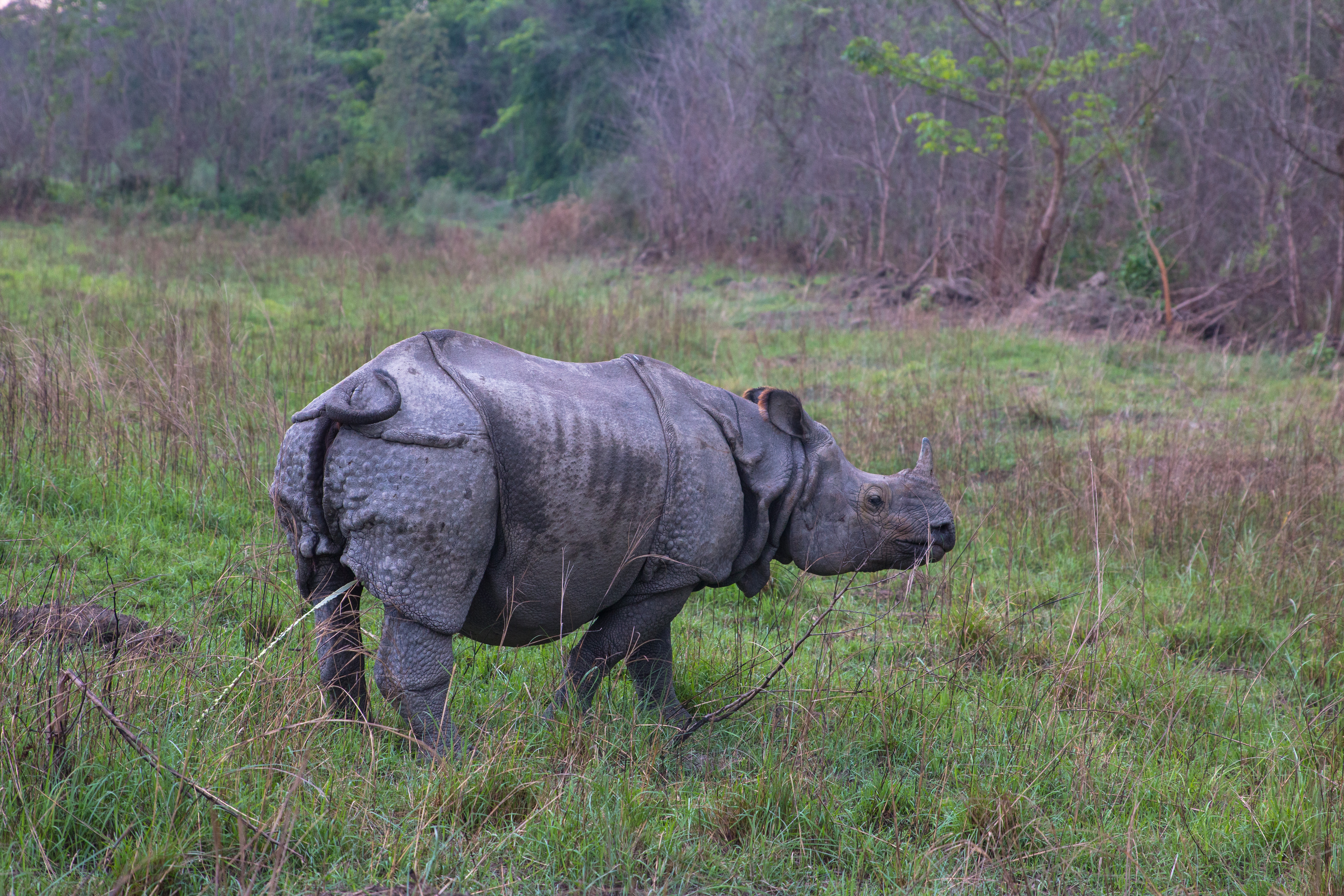
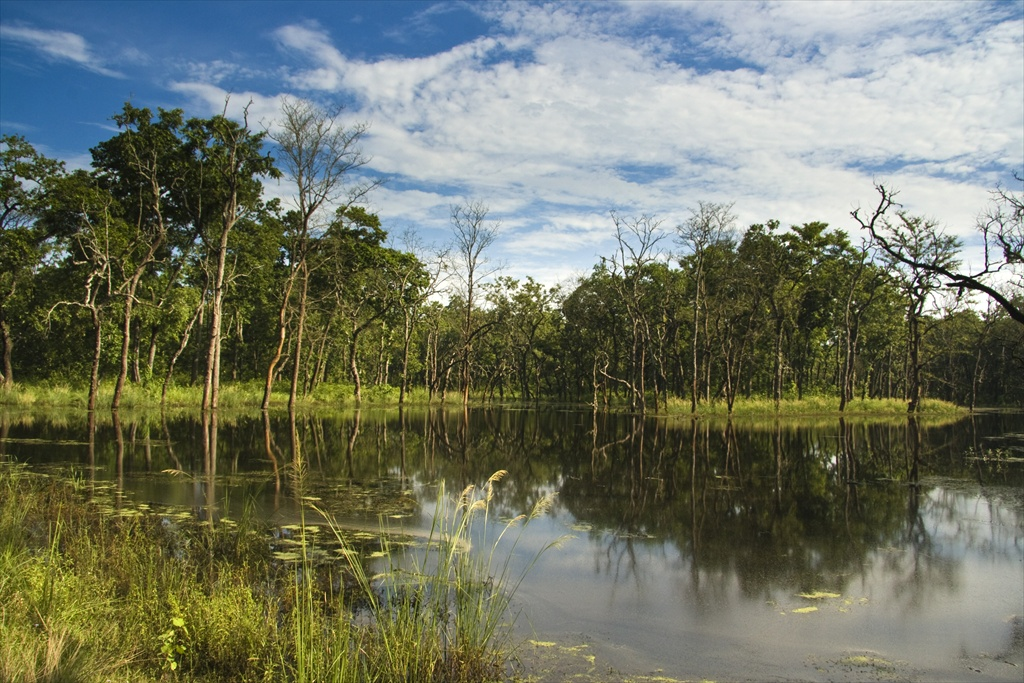
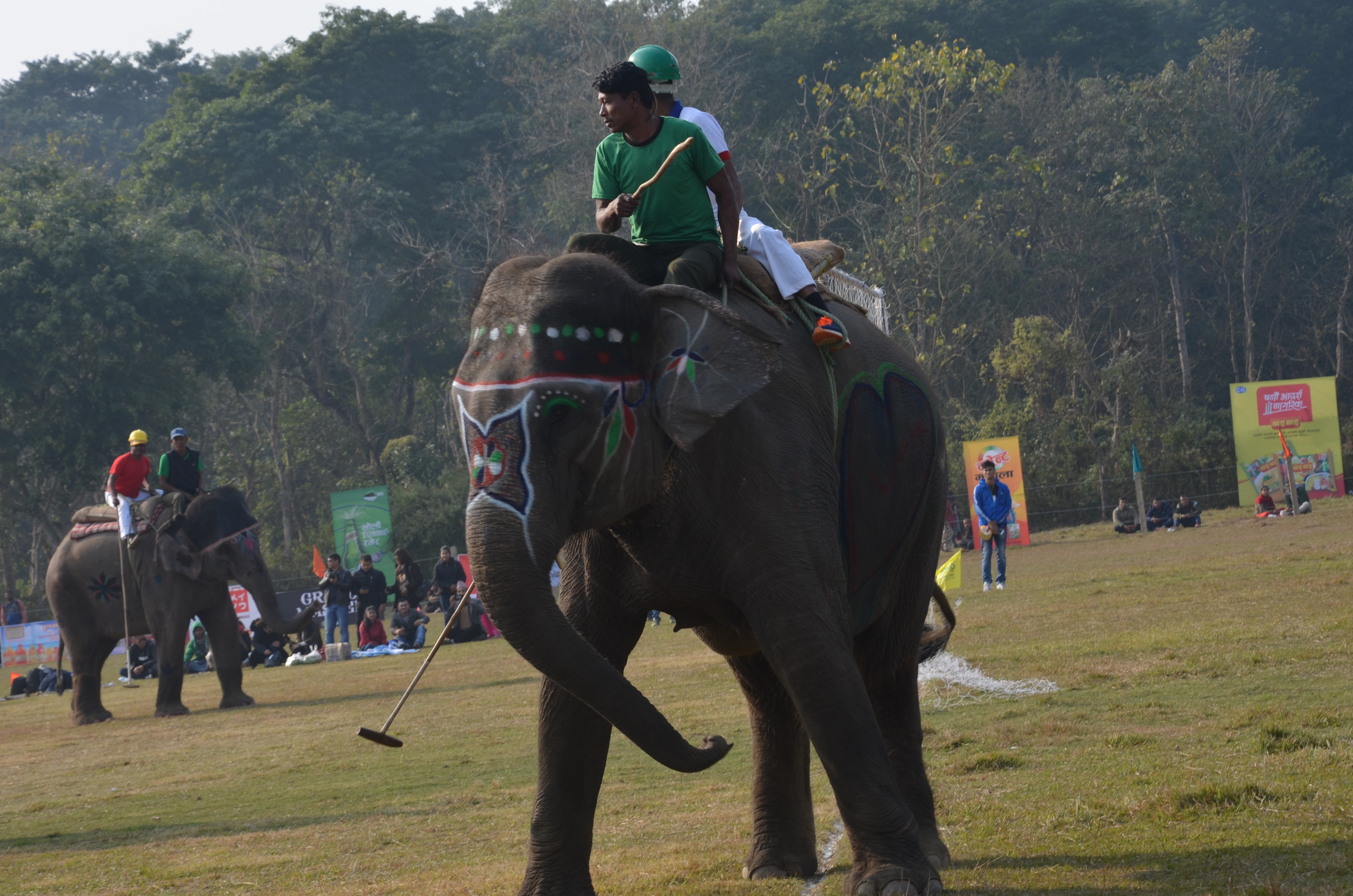
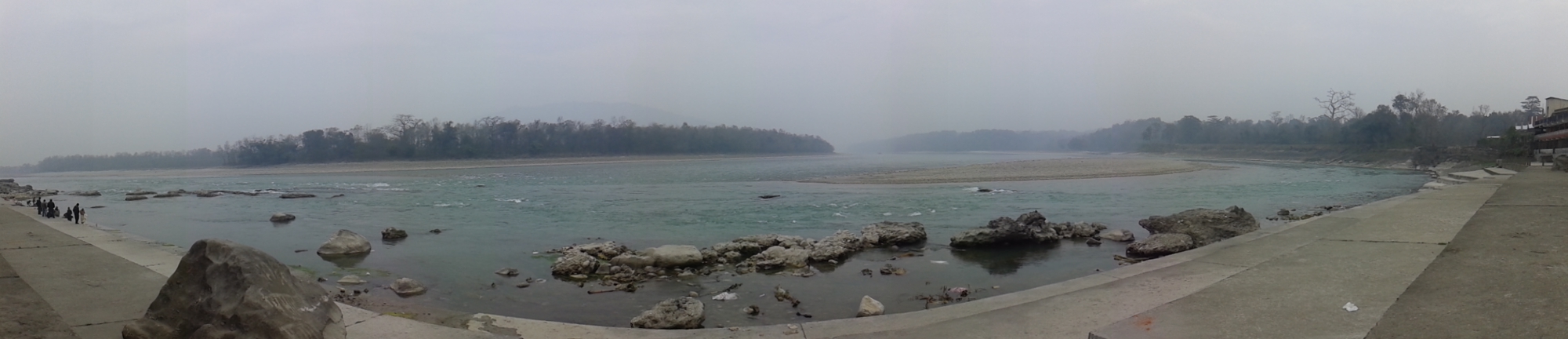
- Bharatpur skyline from Gaindakot hills Jungle Safari One horn Rhino in Chitwan National Park Bishazari Tal Elephant Polo Narayani river
- Nickname: "Medi City"
- Interactive map of Bharatpur
- Location in Nepal Bharatpur (Nepal)
- Coordinates: 27°41′N 84°26′E
- Country: Nepal
- Province: Bagmati
- District: Chitwan

Government
  - Mayor: Chitrasen Adhikari (acting)
  - Deputy Mayor: Chitrasen Adhikari (NC)
  - Chief District Officer (CDO): Ganesh Aryal

Area
  - Total: 433 km^{2} (167 sq mi)
- Elevation: 208 m (682 ft)

Population (2021)
  - Total: 369,268
  - Rank: 3rd (Nepal); 2nd (Bagmati Province)
  - Density: 853/km^{2} (2,210/sq mi)
  - Metro rank: 3rd
  - Ethnicities: Bahun Chhetri Newars Tharus Magars Gurungs
- Time zone: UTC+05:45 (NST)
- Postal Code: 44200, 44207
- Area code: 056
- Airport: Bharatpur Airport
- Climate: Cwa
- Stadium: Gautam Buddha Int'l Stadium
- Website: www.bharatpurmun.gov.np

Bharatpur (/ˈbʌrətpʊr/, Nepali: भरतपुर, pronounced [ˈbʱʌɾʌt̪pur]) is a metropolitan city in south central Nepal. It is the third most populous city of Nepal after Kathmandu and Pokhara with 369,268 inhabitants in 2021. It is also the second largest metropolitan city in Nepal by area. It is the district headquarters of the Chitwan District.

Bharatpur is one of the fastest-growing cities in Nepal. It lies on the eastern bank of the Narayani River and serves as a commercial center of the Chitwan district and the central region of Nepal. Most of the shopping area lies in the area of Narayangadh, while government offices, hospitals and colleges are situated in other parts of the city, including Nepal's premier cancer hospital, B.P. Koirala Memorial Cancer Hospital.

== Geography ==
In March 2017, Bharatpur was declared a metropolitan city after Narayani Municipality, Chitrawan Municipality and Kabilas Village were merged into it.

== Demographics ==
At the time of the 2021 Nepal census, Bharatpur Metropolitan City had a population of 369,268. Of these, the linguistic distribution was as follows: - 73.3% spoke Nepali - 5% spoke Tharu - 5% spoke Gurung - 3.8% spoke Magar Dhut - 3.6% spoke Tamang - 2.7% spoke Bhojpuri - 2.6% spoke Nepalbhasha (Newari) - 0.7% spoke Maithili - 0.7% spoke Darai.

In terms of ethnicity/caste: - 32.1% were Brahman (Hill) - 12.4% were Kshetri - 8.8% were Gurung - 6.7% were Magar - 5.9% were Bishwokarma - 5.7% were Tamang - 5.6% were Tharu - 5.4% were Newa (Newar) - 2.3% were Pariyar - 2.2% were Kumal.

In terms of religion: - 83.6% were Hindu - 12.9% were Bouddha - 1.4% were Islam - 0.1% were Kirat - 1.6% were Christian - 0.1% were Prakriti - 0.3% were Bon - 0.00% were Jain - 0.00% were Baháʼí - 0.00% were Sikha.

Religion in Bharatpur (2021)
| Religion | Percent |
| Hinduism | 83.6% |
| Buddhism | 12.9% |
| Islam | 1.4% |
| Kirat | 0.1% |
| Christianity | 1.6% |
| Prakriti | 0.1% |
| Bon | 0.3% |
| Jain | 0.0% |
| Baháʼí | 0.0% |
| Sikha | 0.0% |

Ethnic Groups in Bharatpur (2021)
1. Hill Brahmin (32.1%)
2. Kshetri (12.4%)
3. Gurung (8.80%)
4. Magar (6.70%)
5. Bishwokarma (5.90%)
6. Tamang (5.70%)
7. Tharu (5.60%)
8. Others (22.0%)
Language in Bharatpur (2021)
1. Nepali 73.3 (70.9%)
2. Tharu 5 (4.84%)
3. Gurung 5 (4.84%)
4. Magar Dhut 3.8 (3.68%)
5. Tamang 3.6 (3.48%)
6. Bhojpuri 2.7 (2.61%)
7. Others 10 (9.67%)

== Ward profile ==
Chairperson of Wards

- Ward-no-1:Keshav Maharjan(NC)
- Ward-no-2:Manoj Ranabhat(NC)
- Ward-no-3:Vikas Thapa(CPN-UML)
- Ward-no-4:Arpan Pokharel(NC)
- Ward-no-5:Yuddha Prasad Shrestha(NC)
- Ward-no-6:Krishna Lal Shrestha(NC)
- Ward-no-7:Rajendra Mani Kafle(Unified Socialist)
- Ward-no-8:Jevanath Kandel(NC)
- Ward-no-9:Yamalal Kandel(Unified Socialist)
- Ward-no-10:Prameshor Khanal(NC)
- Ward-no-11:Kamal Bahadur Mall(CPN-UML)
- Ward-no-12:Lekh Raj Pant(CPN-UML)
- Ward-no-13:Prakash Dawadi(Maoist-Centre)
- Ward-no-14:Rajendra Sankhi(NC)
- Ward-no-15:Shri Krishna Devkota(NC)
- Ward-no-16:Amrit Raj Hamal(NC)
- Ward-no-17:Lalit Man Tamang(NC)
- Ward-no-18:Babu Ram Ranamgar(CPN-UML)
- Ward-no-19:Prakash Tamang(CPN-UML)
- Ward-no-20:Mukti Prasad Ghale(NC)
- Ward-no-21:Krishna Kumar Gurung(NC)
- Ward-no-22:Vishnu Raj Mahato(Unified Socialist)
- Ward-no-23:Deepak Dawadi(NC)
- Ward-no-24:Ram Bahadur Godar(Maoist-Centre)
- Ward-no-25:Chabilal Sapkota(Independent)
- Ward-no-26:Gyan Prasad Khanal(Maoist-Centre)
- Ward-no-27:Ram Bahadur Bhandari(NC)
- Ward-no-28:Danda Pani Rijal(CPN-UML)
- Ward-no-29:Surya Bahadur Gurung(NC)

== Climate ==
Climate data for Bharatpur (Rampur Bazaar), elevation 189 m (620 ft), (1991–2020 normals)
| Month | Jan | Feb | Mar | Apr | May | Jun | Jul | Aug | Sep | Oct | Nov | Dec | Year |
|---|---|---|---|---|---|---|---|---|---|---|---|---|---|
| Mean daily maximum °C (°F) | 22.1 (71.8) | 26.1 (79.0) | 31.5 (88.7) | 35.4 (95.7) | 36.1 (97.0) | 34.9 (94.8) | 33.5 (92.3) | 33.6 (92.5) | 33.2 (91.8) | 32.0 (89.6) | 28.4 (83.1) | 24.0 (75.2) | 30.9 (87.6) |
| Daily mean °C (°F) | 15.1 (59.2) | 17.9 (64.2) | 22.4 (72.3) | 26.7 (80.1) | 29.1 (84.4) | 29.8 (85.6) | 29.4 (84.9) | 29.5 (85.1) | 28.8 (83.8) | 25.9 (78.6) | 20.9 (69.6) | 16.6 (61.9) | 24.3 (75.8) |
| Mean daily minimum °C (°F) | 8.1 (46.6) | 9.7 (49.5) | 13.3 (55.9) | 18.0 (64.4) | 22.0 (71.6) | 24.6 (76.3) | 25.3 (77.5) | 25.4 (77.7) | 24.3 (75.7) | 19.8 (67.6) | 13.4 (56.1) | 9.1 (48.4) | 17.8 (63.9) |
| Average precipitation mm (inches) | 18.1 (0.71) | 14.6 (0.57) | 21.9 (0.86) | 55.6 (2.19) | 165.3 (6.51) | 342.4 (13.48) | 573.3 (22.57) | 438.3 (17.26) | 276.7 (10.89) | 77.2 (3.04) | 8.8 (0.35) | 17.5 (0.69) | 2,009.6 (79.12) |
Source 1: Department of Hydrology and Meteorology
Source 2: Agricultural Extension in South Asia (precipitation 1976–2005)

== Economy ==
The economy of Bharatpur is traditionally based on agriculture. The city also holds a small-scale processing industry that mostly processes the food surpluses of the Chitwan district. Their products are sold to major cities of Nepal, Kathmandu and Pokhara.

The poultry industry is expanding in the municipality, producing a significant amount of poultry products for the country, and is one of the main employment sources in the Chitwan District.

Other products from the city include honey, mushrooms, and flowers. A significant part of its economy is derived from education and health services.

== Tourist attractions ==
=== Bishazari Tal ===
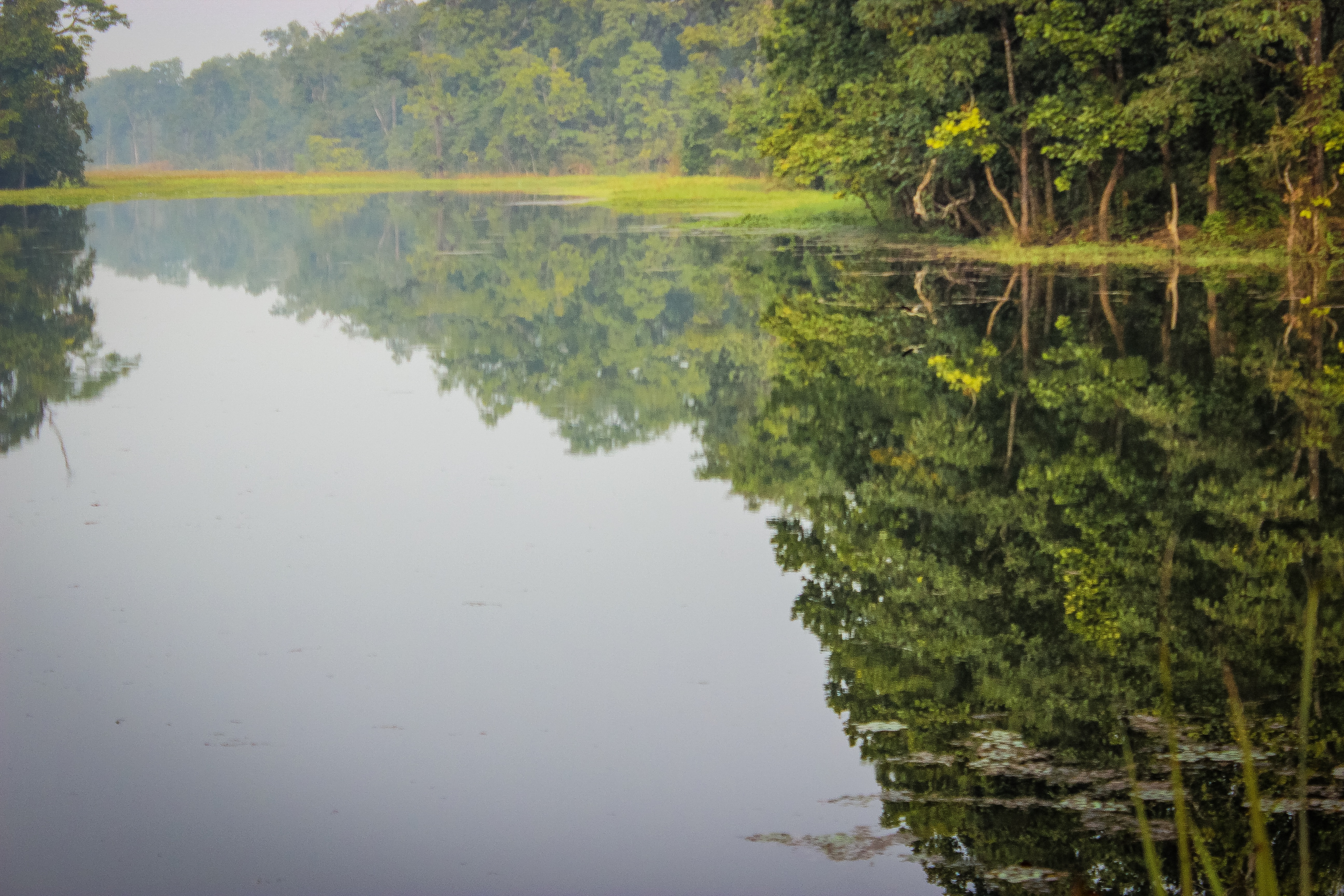
Bishazari Tal

Bishazari Tal, meaning "Lake twenty thousand", is in south Bharatpur. The lake serves as a bird watching center and houses many crocodiles. Bishazari Tal lies near Chitwan National Park and 5 km (3.1 mi) south of the city center, Chaubiskoti, of Bharatpur. Pandeyghumti is the nearest chowk (square) from the lake, being only 1 km (0.62 mi) away.

=== Chitwan National Park ===
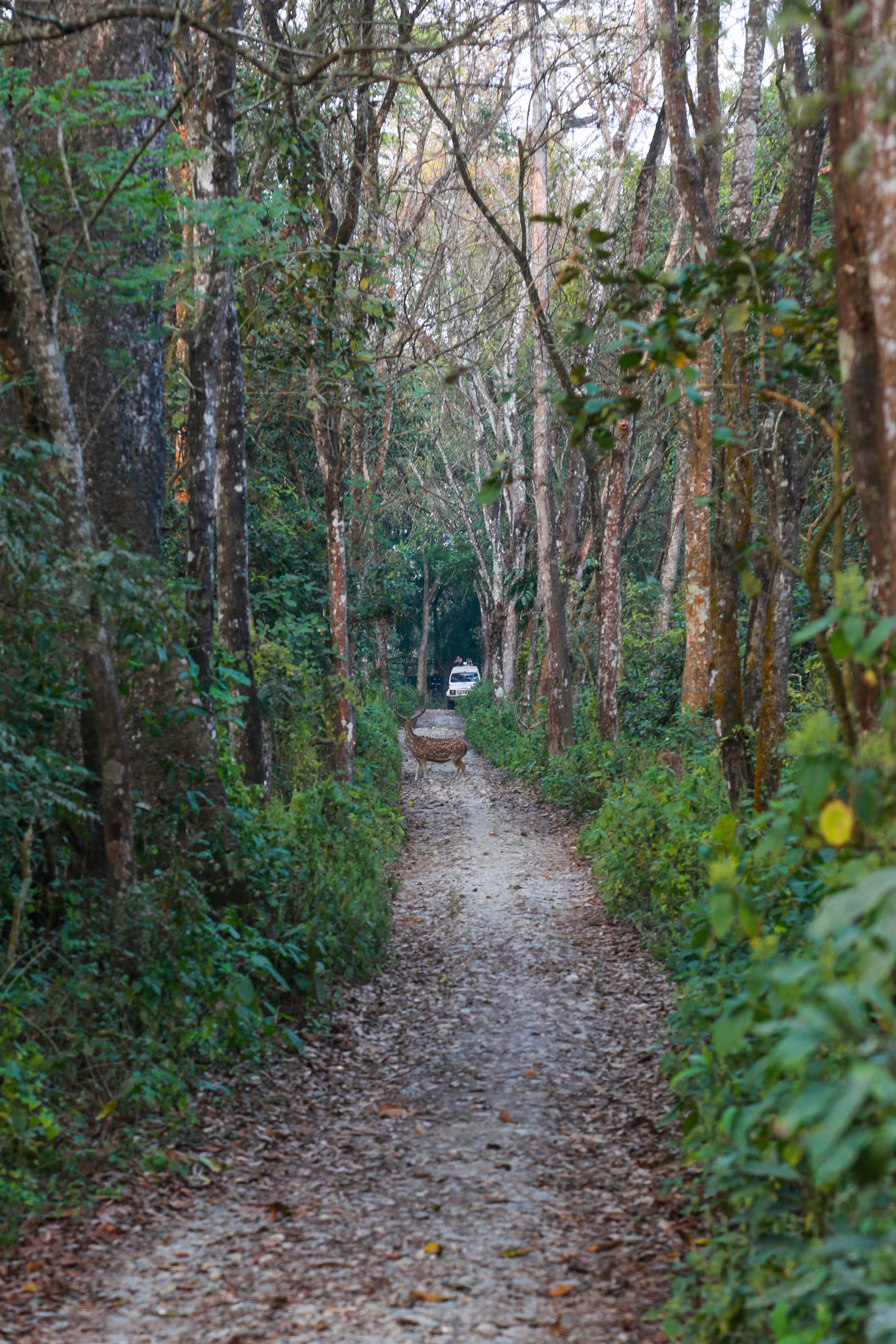
Chitwan national park jungle safari.

Nearby, Chitwan National Park चितवन राष्ट्रिय निकुञ्ज is home to one-horned rhinos, elephants, Bengal tigers, crocodiles, deer and many other wild animals. It is the third largest tourist destination in Nepal after Kathmandu and Pokhara. The park has been listed in the UNESCO World Heritage List since 1983.

=== Narayani River ===
The Narayani River flows north to south in the south of Bharatpur. It is the deepest and one of the largest rivers in Nepal. The Narayani Bridge over this river connects Chitwan District with Nawalpur District of Nepal. Small islands, like Nagarban in Narayani river, are popular picnic spots.

=== Rapti River ===
The Rapti River flows east to southwest in the south of Bharatpur and meets the northern border of the Chitwan National Park.

== Religious and cultural landmarks ==
- Devghat: Devghat is a holy place for Hindus and is located in ward no. 1 on the banks of the Narayani River and the Kali River Junction. Various caves and temples of Hindu deities are located here. Devghat also holds a significant natural attraction because of the two main holy rivers.
- Ganeshdham (Baseni) is the most famous Hindu temple in Bharatpur. This temple is believed to be constructed by Muni Makunda Sen, King of Palpa in the 15th century, but the modern temple was constructed in 1952 in the period of King Mahendra. This temple is located in Baseni, ward no. 11. Every Tuesday, people from different parts of the city worship Ganesha here. there are Pasupatinath, Kamaleshowr Mahadev, Chandeshwari, Manakamana devi Sarswati devi And Krishna temple within the compound of Ganeshdham the main temple belongs to Siddhibinyak Ganesh this historic religious site has its Masterplan including a 11 hectare lake and another famous religious site of Kailashnath Mahadev.
- Bageshwari Temple: Another ancient temple, located in ward no. 2, is believed to have been built before Muni Makunda Sen and was renovated by yogi Narahari Nath. It is located in the Devghat area development district, but the area of Bageshwari temple is also being used by Bharatpur Medical College.
- Harihar Temple (Narayangadh): Harihar is another name of the Hindu deity Vishnu. This temple is on the banks of Narayani river.
- Mahakaleshwar Shiva Mandir (Bharatpur -10): The Mahakaleshwar Shiva Mandir Temple is the only temple of Shiva around this locality. This temple is made with many antiques. Along with the building itself, the temple altogether has 108 lingam, Havan Kunda, Hanuman statues, Satsang halls and Ganesha temples. Gauri Kund can also be seen in the temple periphery.
- Kalika Temple: Kalika is one of an important Hindu goddesses. This temple is located in gaindakot and is just 16 minute ride from the main bharatpur city. It is more recently constructed than the others, being built around 1992 in the top of the Hill. It is seen from most of the places of Both Gaindakot, Nawalpur and Bharatpur city.
- Jakhadi Mai Temple (Baseni): The Jakhadi Mai Temple is on the eastern corner of the jungle in ward no. 11 and was constructed in 1982 by the locals.
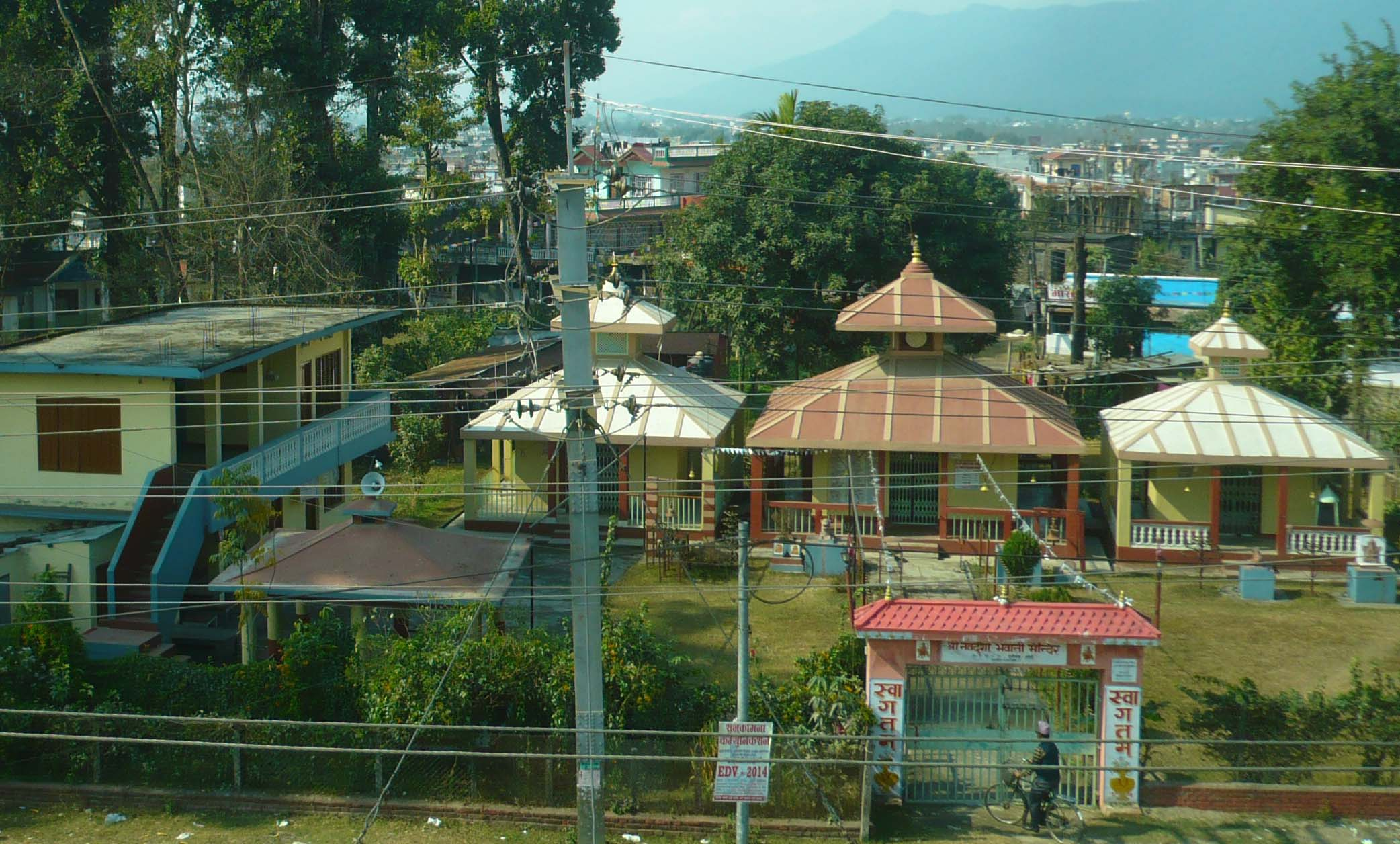
  Durga Temple situated in Bharatpur-11, Baseni, Chitwan District
- Durga Temple (Baseni): The Durga Temple was built by the police force within the compound of Bharatpur's Police Academy in 1992.
- Rameshwar Temple (Kchetrapur): This Mahadev temple was built in 1994. It is the busiest temple in the city and also serves people through a health post.
- Barkati Jame Masjid: The oldest mosque in Chitwan District and one of the oldest and largest one in Nepal. Established in the year 1955 A.D., this historical and cultural mosque is the one to visit. Muslims from Gorkha and surrounding districts entered Chitwan for trade during the time of Mahendra and the mosque was built in the time of Mahendra. The mosque has undergone multiple renovations in the following years. The mosque has three complexes a prayer hall, an annexe and a madrasah.

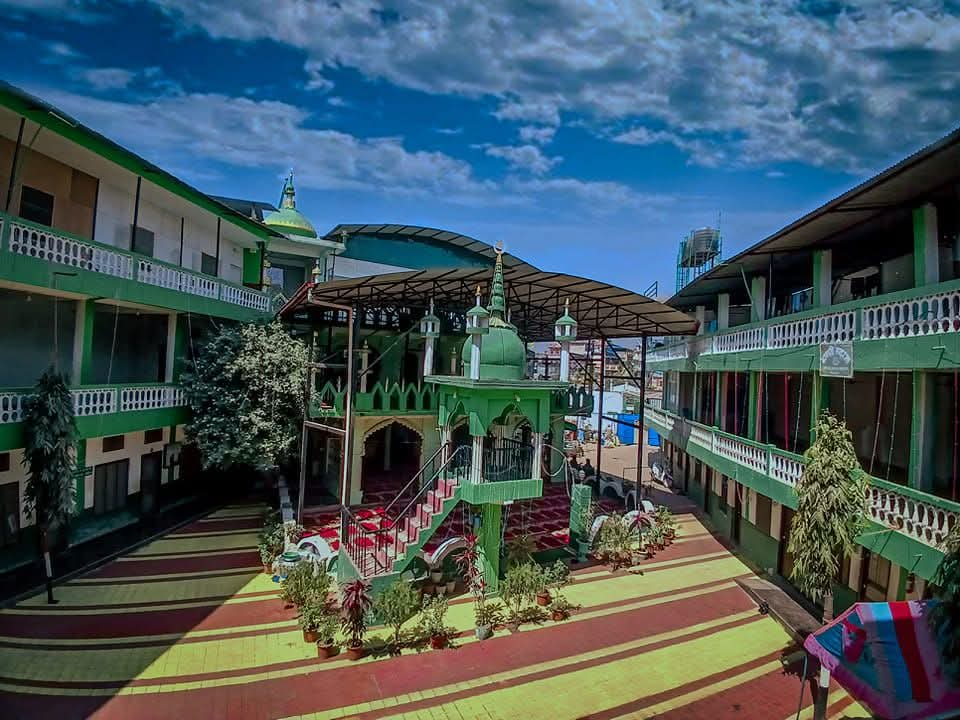
Mosque in Nepal

== Forts and palaces ==
- Upardanghari Fort: Located in the old headquarters of Chitwan district, it is believed to have been built by Satrubhanjan Shah, son of the prince Bahadur Shah, to defend the newly founded kingdom in the seventeenth century.
- Kasara Durbar (Palace) is an old palace built by Rana Regime inside the Chitwan National Park. Now, it is being used as an office of the park and hosts a museum.
- Diyalo Bangala Palace (Aptari Bharatpur): This was the spring season palace used by the Shah Dynasty of Nepal. The Diyalo Bangala Palace was built by King Mahendra to rest during the winter season. It is located on the banks of Narayani river in ward no. 2.
- DAO Building Bharatpur: This long, old building was built in the period of shifting the headquarters from Upardanghadhi. It is now used as an office of the chief district officer.

== Education ==
Bharatpur's Chitwan Higher Secondary School is the oldest government school in Chitwan District. There are several colleges in Bharatpur, including the College of Medical Sciences, Bharatpur and Chitwan Medical College. The city's most famous institution is the Agriculture and Forestry University, which was established in 2010 and is the first technical university in Nepal.

== Healthcare ==
Compared to other parts of the country, Bharatpur has a highly developed healthcare system with several famous hospitals, including the second-largest government hospital in Nepal, which was established with American aid during the malaria control program operated by the US government at the request of the late King Mahendra of Nepal. B.P. Koirala Memorial Cancer Hospital was established with the help of China in 1994. Two medical colleges, the College of Medical Sciences and Chitwan Medical College also maintain their own teaching hospitals. Other important hospitals and nursing homes are Niko Children's Hospital, Narayani Community Hospital, Sishu Fertility Clinic, and Bharatpur Eye Hospital.

== Transportation ==
=== Airport ===
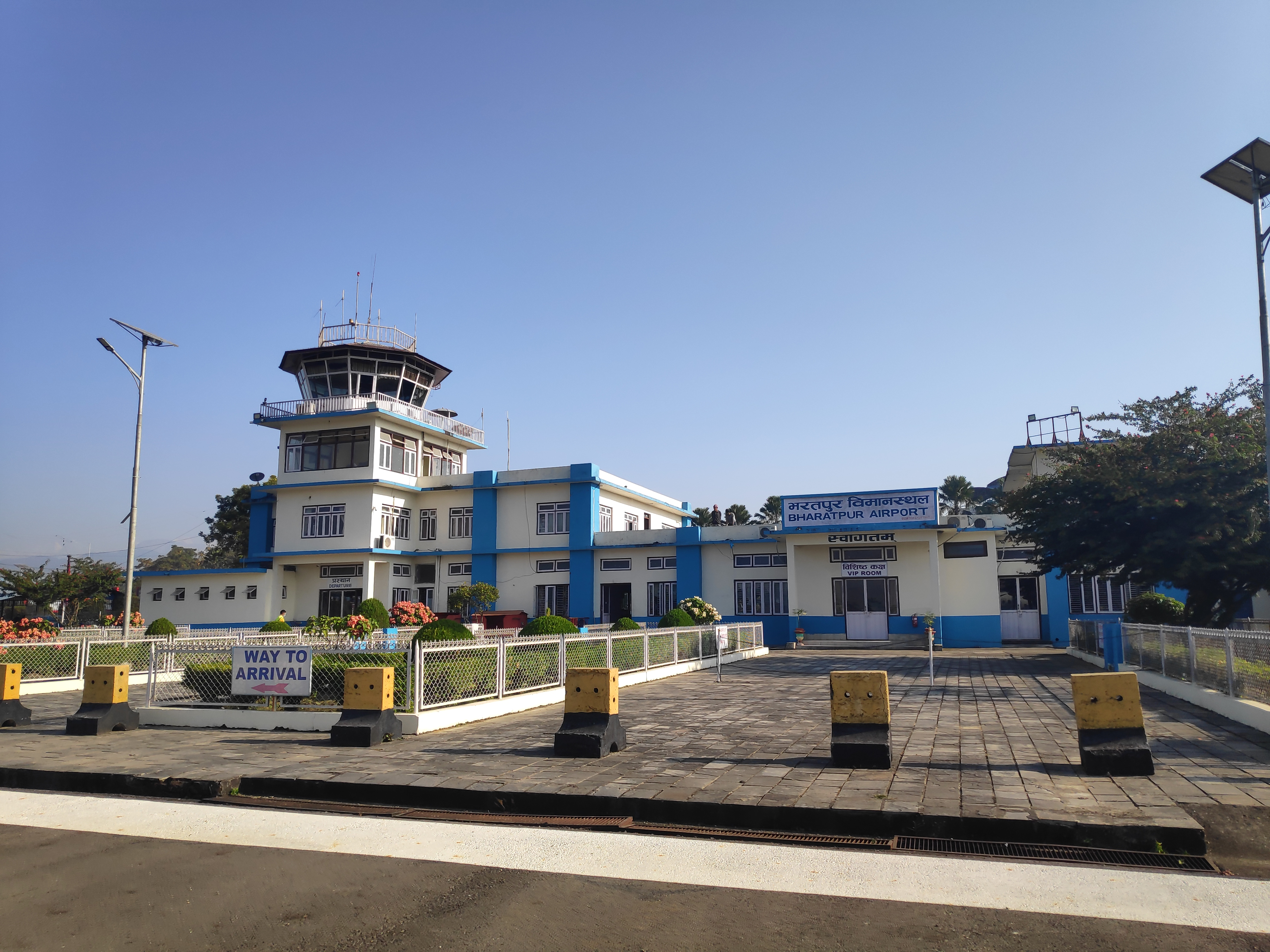
Bharatpur Airport

Bharatpur is located at the crossing of Mahendra Highway and Madan Ashrit Highway. The closest larger cities are Gorkha Municipality at 67 km (42 mi) and Hetauda at 78 km (48 mi). Kathmandu is located 146 km (91 mi) away.

Bharatpur is the only city in Nepal that has two operating airports. Bharatpur Airport, in the central part of the city, offers daily flights to Kathmandu and to Pokhara. Meghauli Airport is a smaller airstrip in the southwest of the city.

Public transportation consists of privately run bus or microbus services. There are also frequent bus services to Kathmandu and Birgunj. Public bus service is available to the people from the city to Danda of Nawalpur District, Butwal, and other major cities and small villages and towns too.

== Sports ==
The under construction Gautam Buddha International Cricket Stadium is situated in the city. The Chitwan Rhinos represented the city and Chitwan as a whole in the Nepal Premier League.

== Media ==
Eight major local FM radio stations are broadcast from Bharatpur. They are Amrit FM, Synergy FM, Hamro FM, Radio Triveni, Radio Chitwan, Chitwan Online FM. Kalika music FM, and Kalika FM. The television stations Beso Channel, Avass TV, and Crystal TV also broadcast from Bharatpur.

== Narayangarh ==
Narayangarh (Nepali: नारायणगढ) or Narayanghat (Nepali: नारायणघाट pronounced [naɾajʌɳɡʱaʈ], or [naɾajʌnɡʌɽ]) is an important trading area, which is situated in the centre of Bharatpur. The major neighbourhoods of Narayangarh are Shahid Chowk, Pulchowk, Kshetrapur, Belchowk, Hakimchowk and Milanchowk. Narayangarh is famous for Taas, a spicy fried goat-meat lunch dish served with bhuja or chiura. Narayangarh has extremely hot summers but very mild winters.

== International relations and organizations ==
=== Twin towns – sister cities ===
Bharatpur is twinned with:

- Golmud, China
- Yokosuka

== Notable people ==
- Sushant Subedi >https://www.ucl.ac.uk/bartlett/public-purpose/study/discover-innovation-public-policy-and-public-value-mpa/meet-students-and-alumni/mpa-class-2022-23/sushant-subedi

== Gallery ==
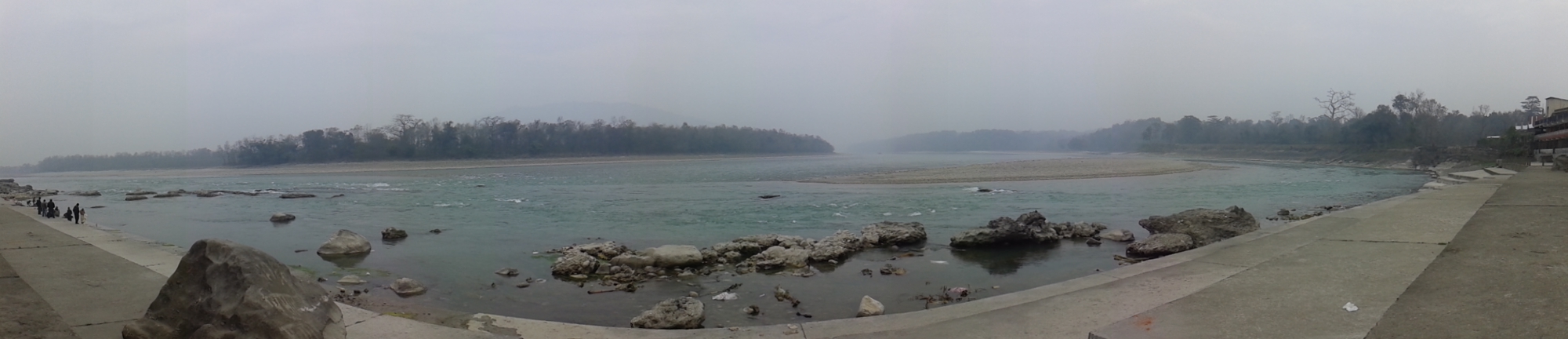
Narayani river as seen from Harihar Temple
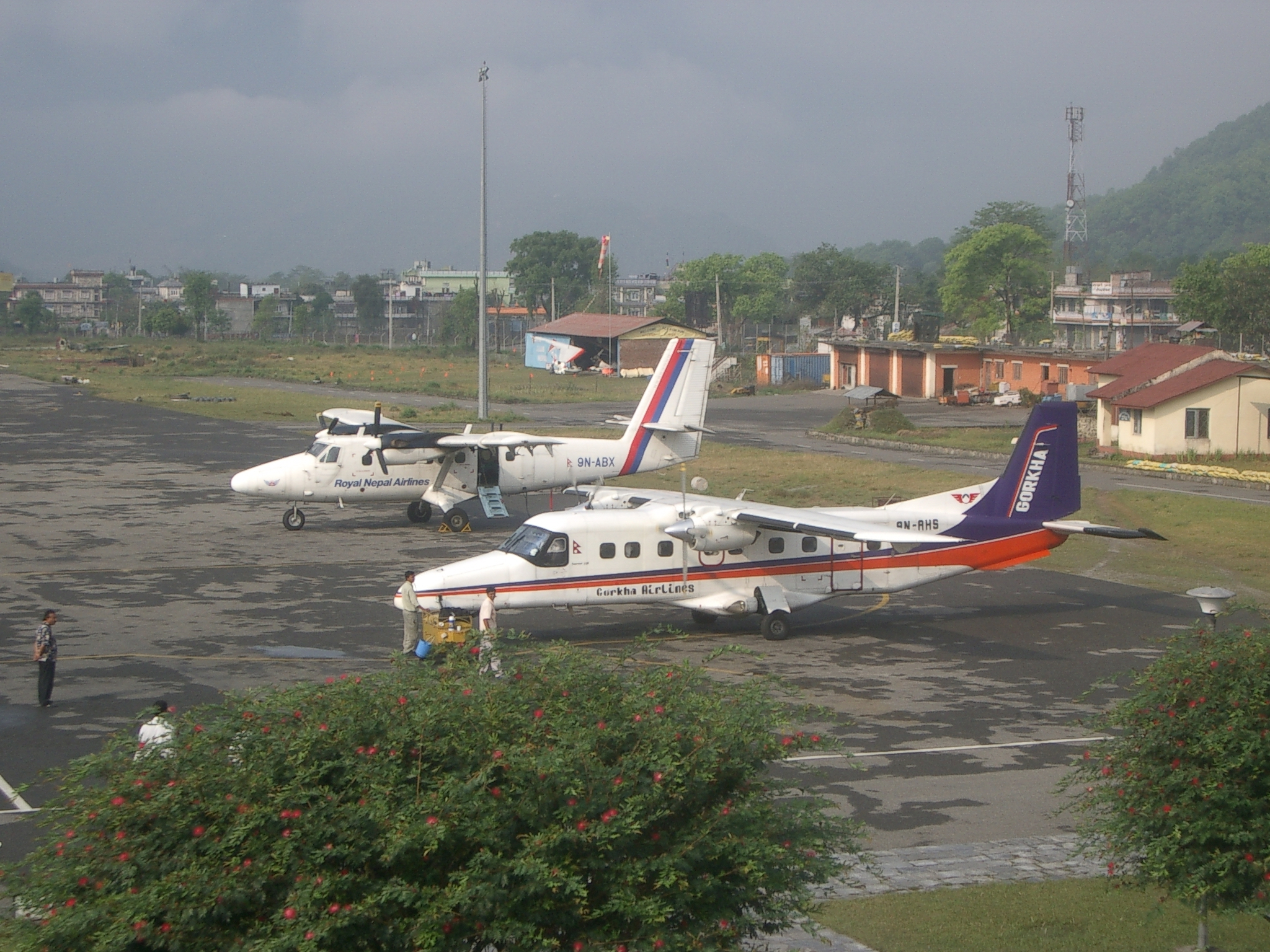
Bharatpur Airport

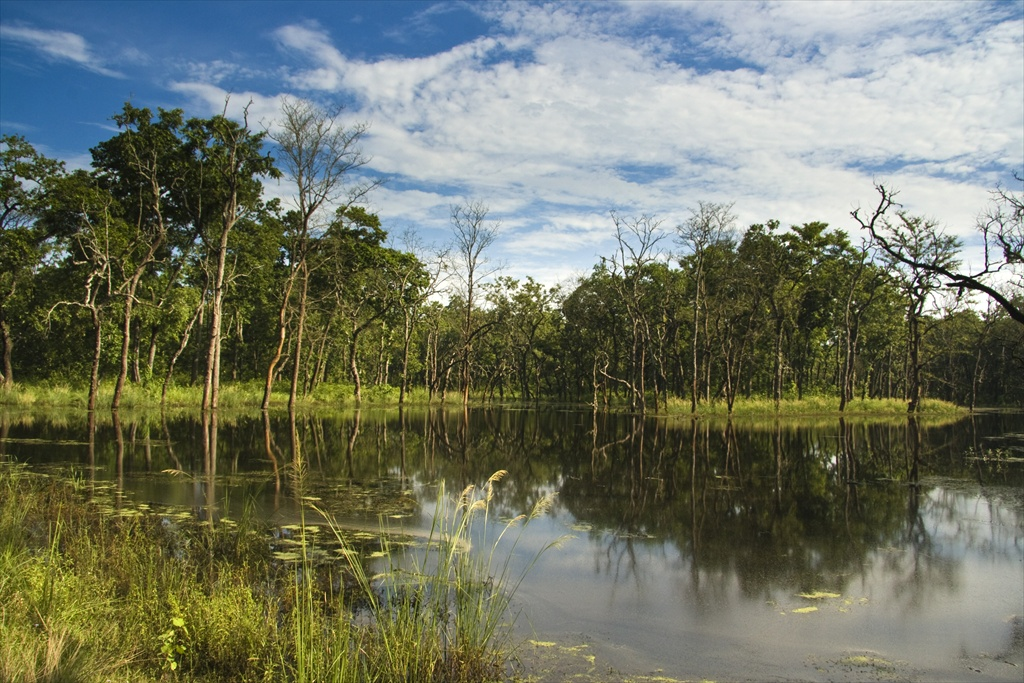
Beeshazar Lake near Chitwan National Park

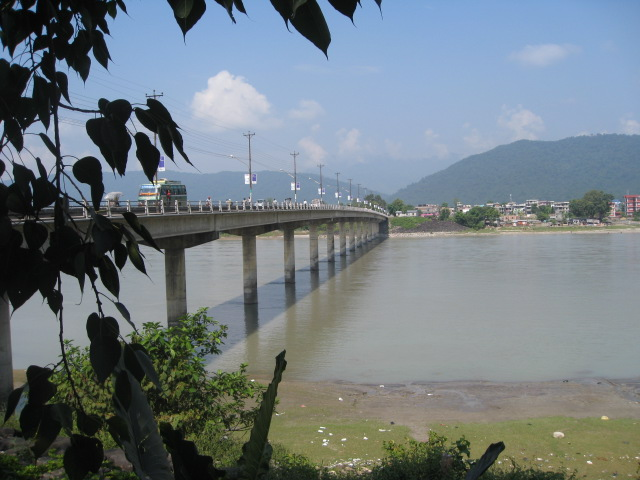
Narayani bridge in Narayangarh, Chitwan, Nepal

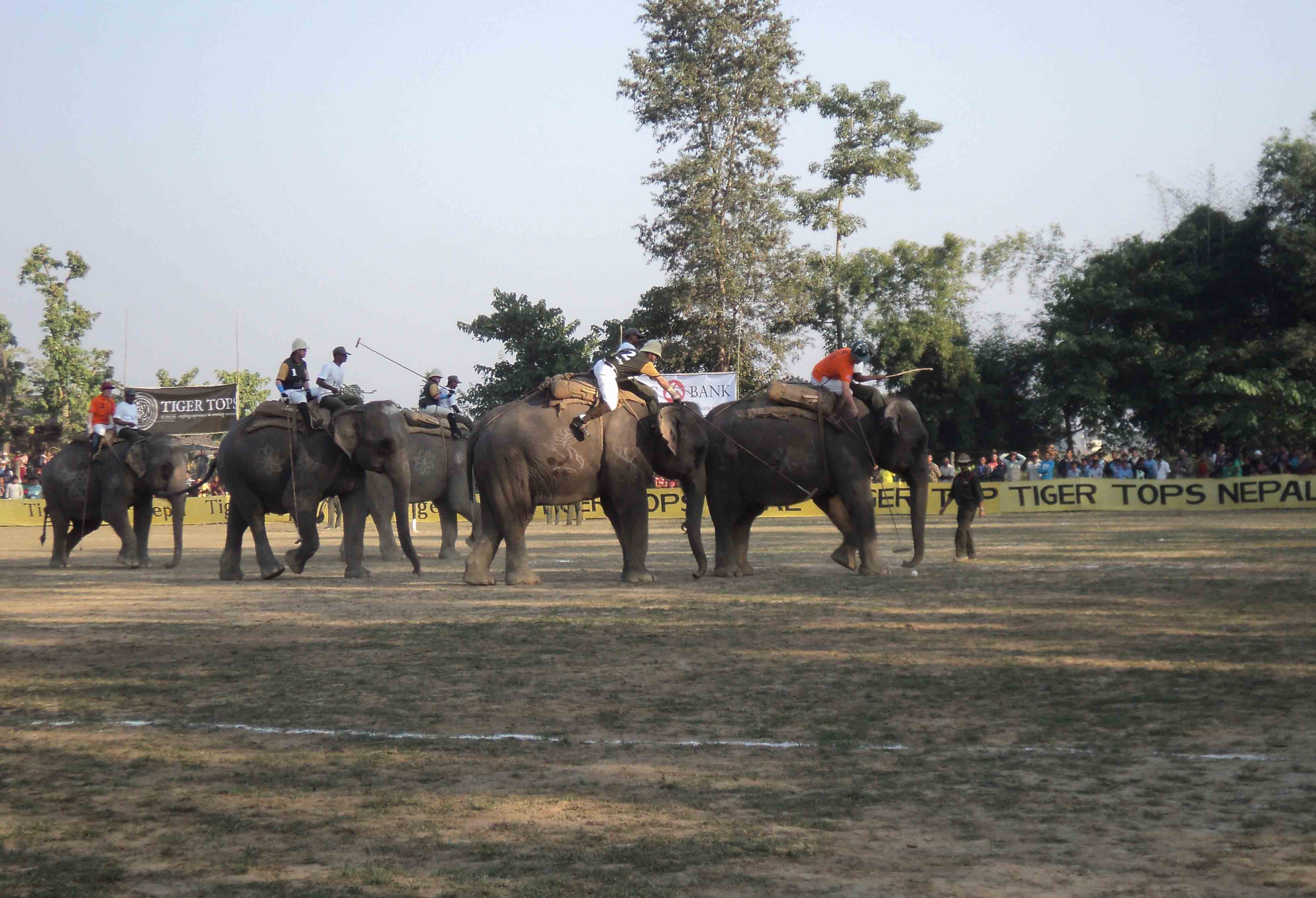
Elephant polo World cup 2012 in Meghauli, Nepal

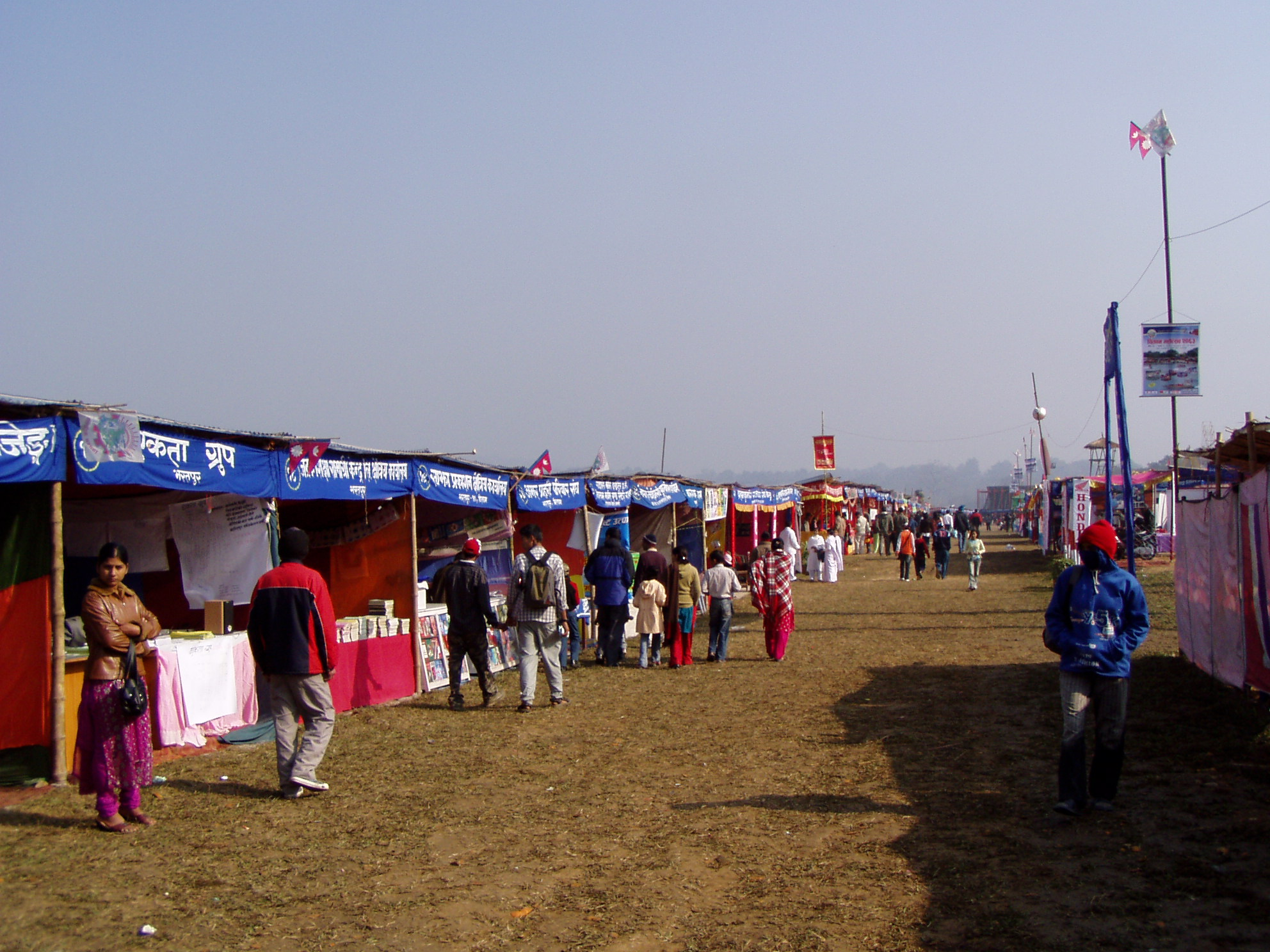
Chitwan Mahotsav 2063 (Chitwan Mahotsav 2007 A.D.) in Narayangarh, Chitwan

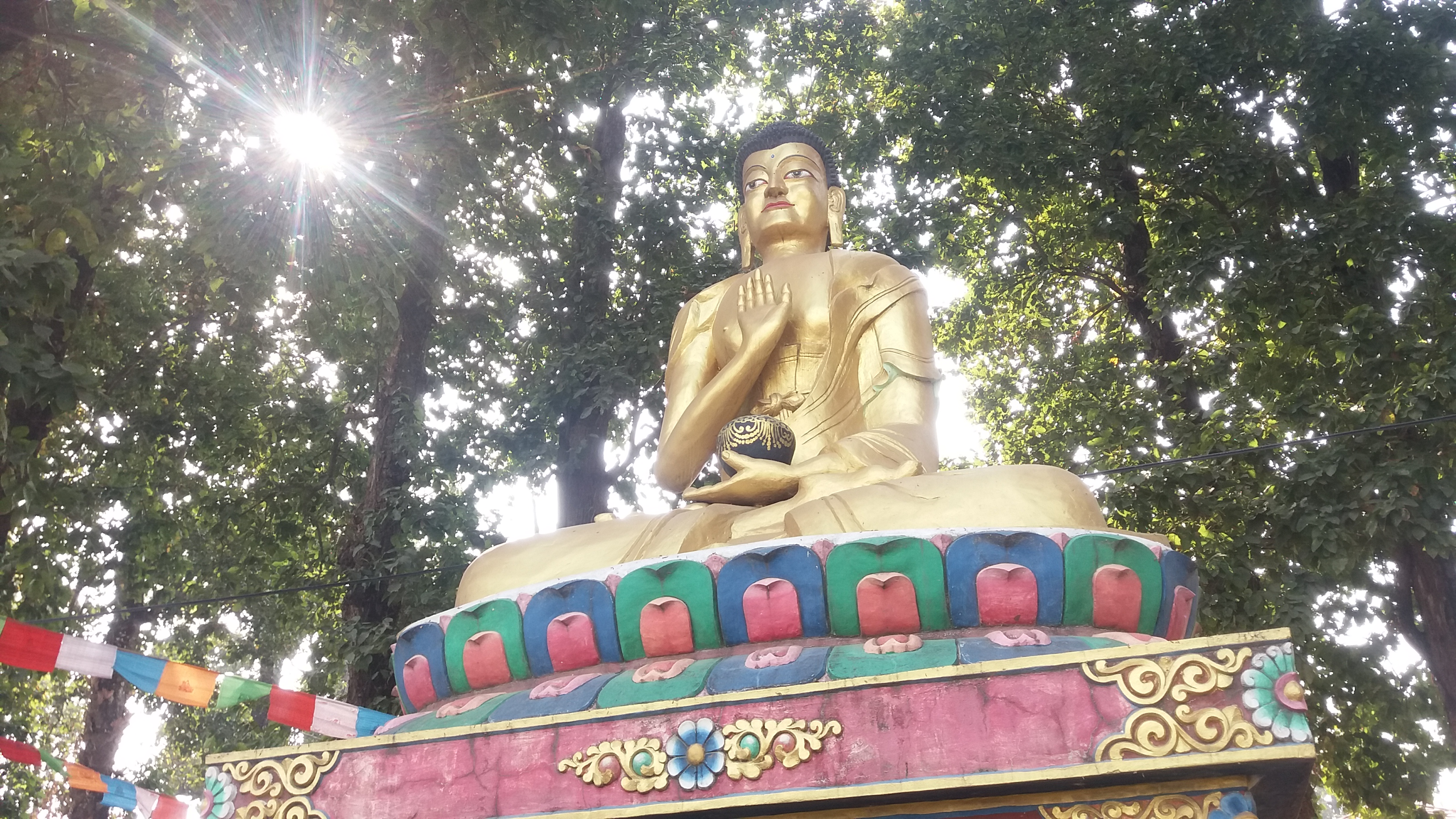
statue of Buddha in Buddha Stupa, Chitwan

== See also ==
- 2022 Bharatpur municipal election
- Renu Dahal
