= Bhanu Municipality =

Municipality in Gandaki Province, Nepal

Bhanu भानु नगरपालिका
- Municipality
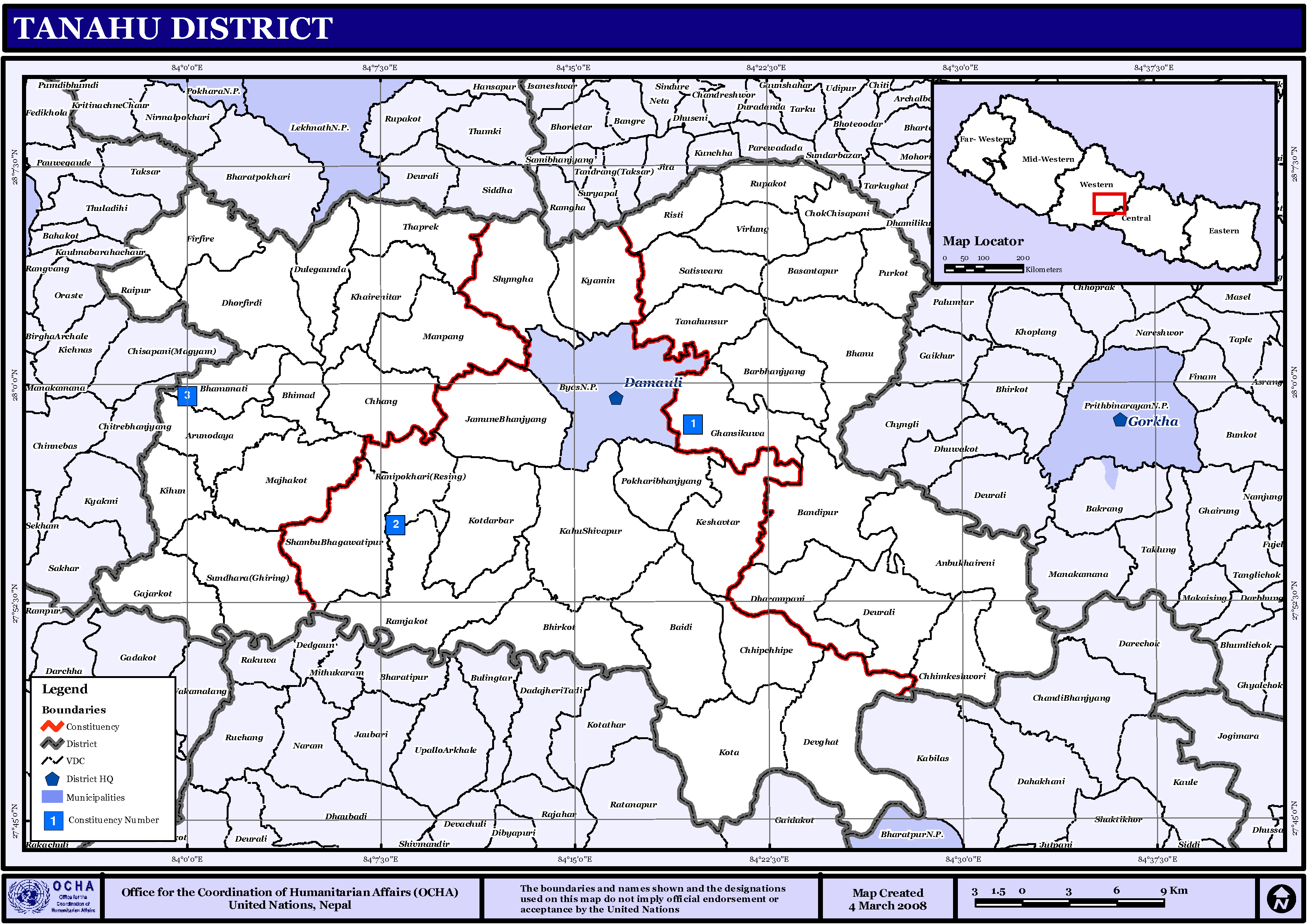

- Location in Nepal Bhanu (Nepal)
- Coordinates: 28.03°N 84.44°E
- Country: Nepal
- Development Region: Western Development Region
- Zone: Gandaki
- District: Tanahun District
- State: Gandaki Province
- Date of Formation: 19 September 2015

Government
  - Mayor: Ananda Raj Tripathi (Nepali Congress)
  - Deputy Mayor: Uma Gotame(Nepali Congress)

Area
  - Total: 184 km^{2} (71 sq mi)

Population (2011)
  - Total: 46,179
  - Density: 251/km^{2} (650/sq mi)
- Time zone: UTC+5:45 (NST)
- Postal code: 33900
- Area code: 065
- Website: bhanumun.gov.np

Bhanu is a municipality of Tanahun District in Gandaki Province of western Nepal. The municipality was established on 19 September 2015 by merging the existing Bhanu village development committee or VDC, Barbhanjyang VDCs, Rupakot (VDC), Tanahunsur Village Development Committee, Purkot VDC, Mirlung VDC, Satiswara VDC, Risti VDC, Basantapur VDC and Chok Chisapani VDC. The center of the municipality is established in former VDC Office of Bhanu. After merging the population of all of the VDCs, it had a total population of 46,179 according to 2011 Nepal census. After the government decision the number of municipalities has reached 217 in Nepal. Nepali poet Bhanubhakta Acharya was born in Bhanu Municipality. It was named after him.

== Demographics ==
At the time of the 2011 Nepal census, Bhanu Municipality had a population of 46,179. Of these, 81.6% spoke Nepali, 7.5% Gurung, 3.7% Newar, 2.9% Tamang, 1.4% Urdu, 1.1% Kumhali, 1.1% Magar, 0.2% Bhojpuri, 0.1% Hindi, 0.1% Rai and 0.1% other languages as their first language.

In terms of ethnicity/caste, 25.5% were Chhetri, 11.8% Hill Brahmin, 11.4% Gurung, 10.3% Newar, 6.7% Magar, 6.5% Sarki, 6.4% Kami, 5.9% Tamang, 3.4% Damai/Dholi, 2.8% Kumal, 2.6% Musalman, 2.4% Gharti/Bhujel, 0.9% Badi, 0.8% Thakuri, 0.4% Gaine, 0.3% Majhi, 0.3% Sanyasi/Dasnami, 0.2% Bote, 0.2% Ghale, 0.2% Rai, 0.1% other Dalit, 0.1% Dura, 0.1% Hajam/Thakur, 0.1% Kamar, 0.1% Kurmi, 0.1% Yadav and 0.2% others.

In terms of religion, 83.7% were Hindu, 11.8% Buddhist, 2.6% Muslim, 1.4% Christian, 0.1% Bon and 0.3% others.

In terms of literacy, 72.8% could read and write, 1.7% could only read and 25.4% could neither read nor write.

== Ward profile ==
There are 13 wards in Bhanu Municipality.

Bhanu Municipality Ward Profile
Present Ward Number	Former VDC	Former Ward Number
1	Bhanu	1
2	Bhanu	2
3	Bhanu	3
4	Bhanu	4,5
5	Bhanu	6,7,8
6	Bhanu, Tanahunsur & Satiswara	Bhanu(Ward No. 9), Tanahunsur(Ward No.1 to Ward No. 3), Satiswara(Ward No. 1)
7	Basantapur	Ward No. 1 to Ward No. 9
8	Purkot	Ward No. 4, Ward No. 6 to Ward No.9
9	Purkot	Ward No. 1 to Ward No. 3, Ward No. 5
10	Chok Chisapani	Ward No. 1 to Ward No.9
11	Rupakot, Tanahu	Ward No. 1 to Ward No.9
12	Mirlung	Ward No. 1 to Ward No. 6
13	Mirlung, Risti, Satiswara	Mirlung (Ward No. 7 to Ward No. 9), Risti (Ward No. 6), Satiswara (Ward No. 2 to Ward No. 5)

== Notable persons ==
- Bhanubhakta Acharya, poet
- Govinda Raj Joshi, politician
- Ram Chandra Poudel, politician
- Rajendra Chhetri, Chief of Army Staff of the Nepali Army

== See also ==
- Village development committee (Nepal)
- Gandaki Zone
- Western Development Region, Nepal
- Chok Chisapani
- Risti, Nepal
- Satiswara
- Purkot
- Tanahunsur
- Samjur
