= Devghat Rural Municipality =

Devghat (RM) देवघाट गाउँपालिका
- Rural Municipality
- Location Devghat (RM) (Nepal)
- Coordinates: 27.80°N 84.41°E
- Country: Nepal
- Province: Gandaki
- District: Tanahun
- Wards: 5
- Established: 10 March 2017

Government
  - Type: Rural Council
  - Chairperson: Mr. Til Bahadur Thapa
  - Vice-chairperson: Mr. Bhuwan Singh Gurung
  - Term of office: (2022 - 2027)

Area
  - Total: 159 km^{2} (61 sq mi)

Population (2011)
  - Total: 16,131
  - Density: 101/km^{2} (263/sq mi)
- Time zone: UTC+5:45 (Nepal Standard Time)
- Headquarter: Devghat
- Website: devghatmun.gov.np

Devghat is a Rural municipality located within the Tanahun District of the Gandaki Province of Nepal. The rural municipality spans 159 square kilometres (61 sq mi) of area, with a total population of 16,131 according to a 2011 Nepal census.

On March 10, 2017, the Government of Nepal restructured the local level bodies into 753 new local level structures. The previous Devghat, Kota, Chhipchhipe and part of Baidi VDCs were merged to form Devghat Rural Municipality. Devghat is divided into 5 wards, with Devghat VDC declared the administrative center of the rural municipality.

== Demographics ==
At the time of the 2011 Nepal census, Devghat Rural Municipality had a population of 16,478. Of these, 44.1% spoke Nepali, 27.7% Magar, 22.0% Gurung, 3.6% Bhujel, 1.3% Bote, 0.6% Tamang, 0.4% Newar, 0.1% Chepang, 0.1% Sign language and 0.1% other languages as their first language.

In terms of ethnicity/caste, 34.8% were Magar, 31.5% Gurung, 8.8% Hill Brahmin, 6.5% Gharti/Bhujel, 3.8% Thakuri, 3.5% Chhetri, 2.6% Kami, 1.8% Bote, 1.8% Damai/Dholi, 1.8% Majhi, 0.8% Newar, 0.8% Tamang, 0.6% Sanyasi/Dasnami, 0.3% Brahmu/Baramo, 0.3% Sarki, 0.1% Chepang/Praja, 0.1% Musalman and 0.2% others.

In terms of religion, 68.0% were Hindu, 28.4% Buddhist, 3.2% Christian, 0.1% Muslim, 0.1% Prakriti and 0.2% others.

In terms of literacy, 67.2% could read and write, 2.0% could only read and 30.7% could neither read nor write.
