= Tanahun 2 =

Parliamentary constituency in Nepal

- Parliamentary constituency for the House of Representatives
- Tanahun 2 in Gandaki Province

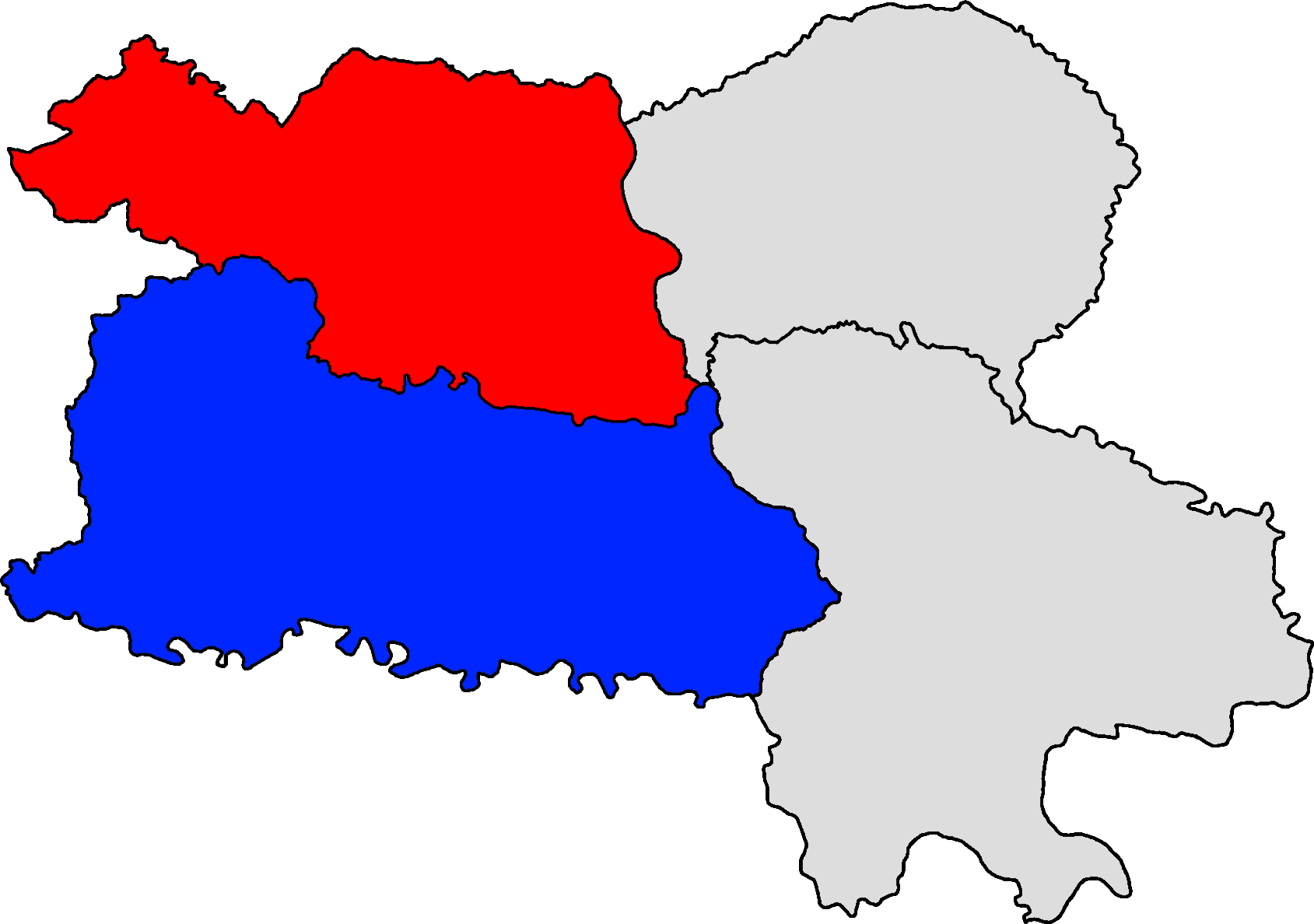
- Assembly segments Tahaun 2(A) and Tanahun 2(B) within Tanahun District
- Province: Gandaki Province
- District: Tanahun District
- Electorate: 127,515

Current constituency
- Created: 1991
- Party: Rastriya Swatantra Party
- MP: Shreeram Neupane
- Gandaki MPA 2(A): Asha Koirala (NCP)
- Gandaki MPA 2(B): Kiran Gurung (NCP)

Tanahun 2 is one of two parliamentary constituencies of Tanahun District in Nepal. This constituency came into existence on the Constituency Delimitation Commission (CDC) report submitted on 31 August 2017.

== Incorporated areas ==
Tanahun 2 incorporates Shuklagandaki Municipality, Bhimad Municipality, Ghiring Rural Municipality, Myagde Rural Municipality, Rhishing Rural Municipality and, wards 5 and 6 of Byas Municipality.

== Assembly segments ==
It encompasses the following Gandaki Provincial Assembly segment

- Tanahun 2(A)
- Tanahun 2(B)

== Members of Parliament ==
=== Parliament/Constituent Assembly ===
Election	Member	Party
1991	Govinda Raj Joshi	Nepali Congress
1994	Ram Chandra Paudel	Nepali Congress
2017	Kedar Sigdel	CPN (Unified Marxist–Leninist)
May 2018	Kedar Sigdel	Nepal Communist Party
2022	Shankar Bhandari	Nepali Congress
2026	Shreeram Neupane	Rastriya Swatantra Party

=== Provincial Assembly ===
==== 2(A) ====
Election	Member	Party
2017	Asha Koirala	CPN (Maoist Centre)
May 2018	Asha Koirala	Nepal Communist Party

==== 2(B) ====
Election	Member	Party
2017	Kiran Gurung	CPN (Unified Marxist-Leninist)
May 2018	Kiran Gurung	Nepal Communist Party

== Election results ==
=== Election in the 2020s ===
==== 2026 general election ====
Candidate	Party	Votes	%
Shreeram Neupane	Rastriya Swatantra Party	32,687	52.23
Shankar Bhandari	Nepali Congress	14,135	22.59
Kedar Sigdel	CPN (UML)	11,668	18.65
Som Bahadur Thapa	Nepali Communist Party	1,953	3.12
Yam Bahadur Thakuri	Rastriya Prajatantra Party	1,117	1.78
Susma Ale	Mongol National Organisation	495	0.79
Others		524	0.84
Total		62,579	100.00
Valid votes		62,579	95.82
Invalid/blank votes		2,730	4.18
Total votes		65,309	100.00
Registered voters/turnout		127,515	51.22
Majority		18,552	
Rastriya Swatantra Party gain			

==== 2022 general election ====
Candidate	Party	Votes	%
Shankar Bhandari	Nepali Congress	30,604	47.64
Kiran Gurung	CPN (UML)	25,130	39.12
Bijay Joshi	Rastriya Swatantra Party	5,373	8.36
Narendra Pratap Mahat	Rastriya Prajatantra Party	1,421	2.21
Others		1,708	2.66
Total		64,236	100.00
Majority		5,474	
Nepali Congress gain			

==== 2022 provincial election ====
===== 2(A) =====
Candidate	Party	Votes	%
Shyam Raja Mahat	CPN (UML)	15,665	43.28
Rajendra Keshari Neupane	CPN (Maoist Centre)	13,899	38.40
Resham Raj Adhikari	Rastriya Prajatantra Party	4,222	11.66
Suman Thapa Magar	Mongol National Organisation	716	1.98
Others	1,695	4.68	
Total		36,197	100.00
Majority		1,766	
CPN (UML)			

===== 2(B) =====
Candidate	Party	Votes	%
Jeet Prakash Ale Magar	Nepali Congress	13,860	47.93
Kedar Sigdel	CPN (UML)	13,220	45.72
Others	1,837	6.35	
Total		28,917	100.00
Majority		640	
Nepali Congress			

=== Election in the 2010s ===
==== 2017 legislative elections ====
Party	Candidate	Votes
CPN (Unified Marxist–Leninist)	Kedar Sigdel	32,924
Nepali Congress	Shankar Bhandari	29,645
CPN (Marxist–Leninist)	Jit Bahadur Pariyar	1,168
Others		1,528
Invalid votes		3,193
Result	CPN (UML) gain	
Source: Election Commission

==== 2017 Nepalese provincial elections ====
===== 2(A) =====
Party	Candidate	Votes
CPN (Maoist Centre)	Asha Koirala	16,646
Nepali Congress	Pradip Paudel	16,641
CPN (Marxist–Leninist)	Sobha Thapa Magar	1,039
Others		1,395
Invalid votes		1,357
Result	Maoist Centre gain	
Source: Election Commission

===== 2(B) =====
Party	Candidate	Votes
CPN (Unified Marxist–Leninist)	Kiran Gurung	15,630
Nepali Congress	Dhruba Wagle	14,214
Others		716
Invalid votes		810
Result	CPN (UML) gain	
Source: Election Commission

==== 2013 Constituent Assembly election ====
Party	Candidate	Votes
Nepali Congress	Ram Chandra Paudel	18,149
CPN (Unified Marxist–Leninist)	Krishna Kumar Shrestha	11,739
UCPN (Maoist)	Om Raj Ale	4,493
Independent	Purna Bahdur Gurung	2,773
Rastriya Janamukti Party	Mandhari Ale	1,022
Others		2,077
Result	Congress hold	
Source: NepalNews

=== Election in the 2000s ===
==== 2008 Constituent Assembly election ====
Party	Candidate	Votes
Nepali Congress	Ram Chandra Paudel	18,970
CPN (Maoist)	Dambar Bahadur Bishwakarma	11,050
CPN (Unified Marxist–Leninist)	Pratap Lal Shrestha	8,892
Rastriya Janamukti Party	Shiva Lal Thapa	2,220
CPN (United)	Parbati Sharma Kafle	1,714
Others		2,140
Invalid votes		2,823
Result	Congress hold	
Source: Election Commission

=== Election in the 1990s ===
==== 1999 legislative elections ====
Party	Candidate	Votes
Nepali Congress	Ram Chandra Paudel	24,446
CPN (Unified Marxist–Leninist)	Shankar Narayan Shrestha	10,325
Rastriya Janamukti Party	Shiva Lal Thapa	5,223
CPN (Marxist–Leninist)	Ravi Narayan Khanal	1,089
Others		1,409
Invalid Votes		707
Result	Congress hold	
Source: Election Commission

==== 1994 legislative elections ====
Party	Candidate	Votes
Nepali Congress	Ram Chandra Paudel	22,639
CPN (Unified Marxist–Leninist)	Bishwabandhu Bhandari	6,493
Rastriya Prajatantra Party	Durga Shrestha	5,957
Rastriya Janamukti Party	Tul Bahadur Chumi	1,697
Rastriya Jana Parishad	Shri Bhadra Khanal	891
Result	Congress hold	
Source: Election Commission

==== 1991 legislative elections ====
Party	Candidate	Votes
Nepali Congress	Govinda Raj Joshi	22,799
Samyukta Jana Morcha Nepal		8,350
Result	Congress gain	

== See also ==
- List of parliamentary constituencies of Nepal
