= Rupakot, Tanahu =

Coordinates: 28°7′N 84°24′E

Rupakot, Tanahun रूपाकोट
- Village development committee
- Location in Nepal Rupakot, Tanahun (Nepal)
- Country: Nepal
- Province: Gandaki Province
- District: Tanahun District

Population (1991)
  - Total: 4,765
- Time zone: UTC+5:45 (Nepal Time)
- Postal code: 33902
- Area code: 065

Rupakot is a village development committee in Tanahu District in Gandaki Province of central Nepal. At the time of the 1991 Nepal census it had a population of 4765 people living in 937 individual households. The VDC has been merged with existing Bhanu village development committees(VDCs), Barbhanjyang village development committees (VDCs) Tanahunsur Village Development Committee, Purkot VDC, Mirlung VDC, Satiswara VDC, Risti VDC, Basantapur VDC and Chok Chisapani VDC on 19 September 2015 to form Bhanu Municipality.
