= Anbu Khaireni Rural Municipality =

Aanbookhaireni आँबुखैरेनि गाउँपालिका
- Rural Municipality
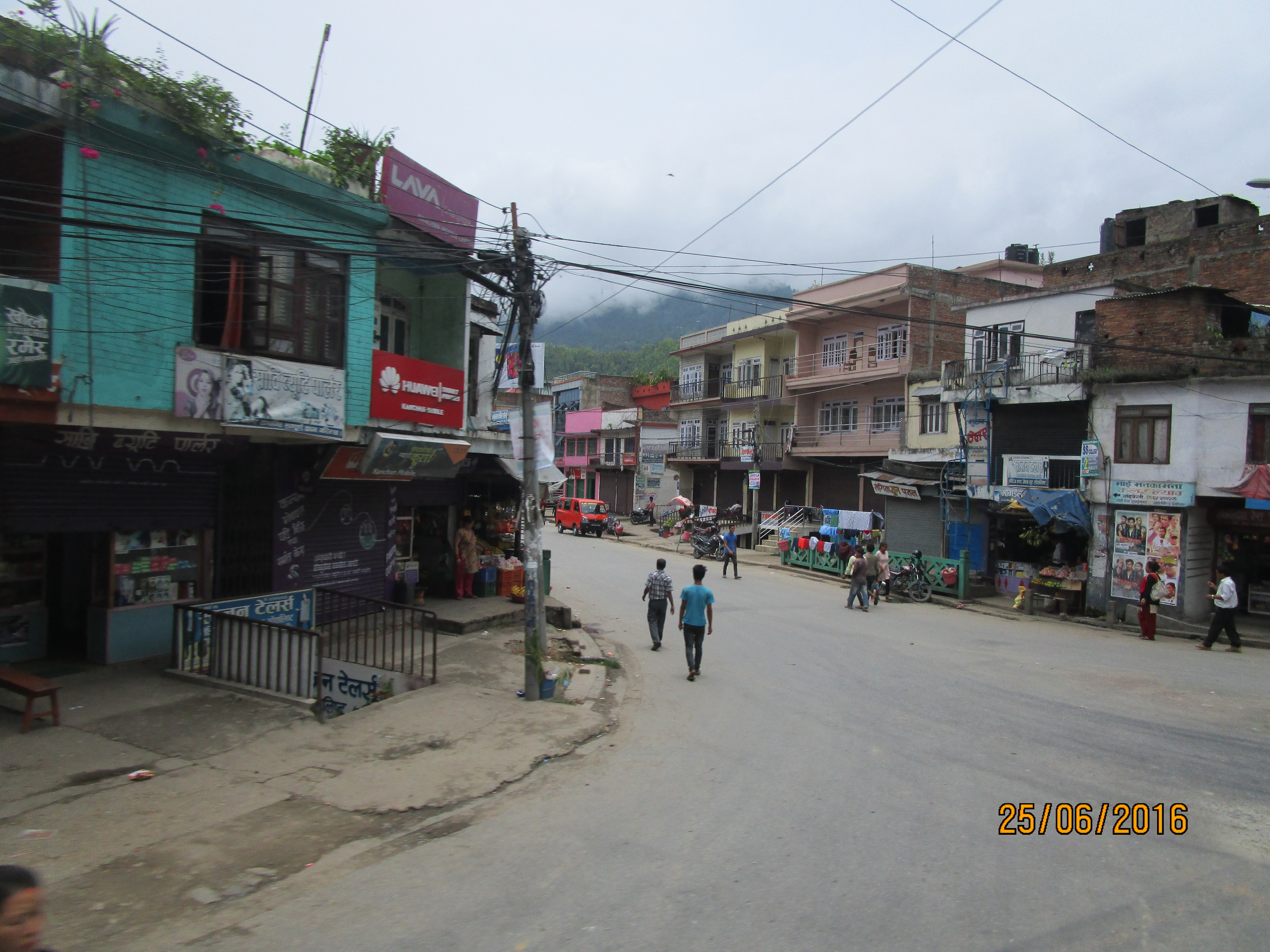
- The starting point of Anbukhaireni Gorkha Road

- Location within Gandaki Province Location within Nepal
- Coordinates: 27.9037°N 84.5399°E
- Country: Nepal
- Province: Gandaki Province
- District: Tanahu District
- Wards: 6
- re-established: 2017

Government
  - Type: Rural Municipality
  - Chairperson: Mr. Shukra Chuman Chettri
  - Deputy Chairperson: Mrs. Durga Aryal

Area
  - Total: 128 km^{2} (49 sq mi)

Population (2011)
  - Total: 20,768
  - Density: 162/km^{2} (420/sq mi)
- Time zone: UTC+5:45 (NST)
- Website: http://anbukhairenimun.gov.np/

Anbu Khaireni (also Aanbu Khaireni, Aanboo Khaireni or Anbukhaireni) (Nepali: आँबुखैरेनि गाउँपालिका) is a rural municipality in Tanahu District in the Gandaki Province of central Nepal which was established in 2015. At the time of the 1991 Nepal census it had a population of 11,450 people living in 2234 individual households. In the census of 2011 the municipality has 16,382 inhabitants.

In 2017, the Government of Nepal restructured the local level bodies into 753 new local level units, at that time the former Anbu Khaireni Municipality restableshed as a rural municipality with same name. The former Chhimkeshwari and Deurali VDCs also were incorporated with this new rural municipality. The rural municipality rearranged into 6 wards.

The Andhi Khola River flows nearby. On its right bank is Satrasaya Phant, which was once a dense forest. The Anpu copper mines lie within a kilometre from the village.

To promote local culture Anbu khaireni has one FM radio station Mero Sathi FM - 107.2 MHz which is a Community radio station. And Anboo Khaireni hospital with 15 bed facility is also established in 2023 A.D. with the effort of chairperson Shukra Chuman Chettri. Famous Aaina Pahara is also situated here which is also renovated now by chairperson putting it as a "Dream Project" of Aanboo Khaireni Rural Municipality.

== Demographics ==
At the time of the 2011 Nepal census, Anbu Khaireni Rural Municipality had a population of 20,840. Of these, 65.7% spoke Nepali, 15.1% Gurung, 13.3% Magar, 1.7% Newar, 1.4% Bhujel, 0.8% Bhojpuri, 0.4% Tamang, 0.3% Maithili, 0.2% Hindi, 0.2% Urdu, 0.1% Bengali, 0.1% Rai, 0.1% Sign language, 0.1% Thakali and 0.1% other languages as their first language.

In terms of ethnicity/caste, 30.8% were Gurung, 22.9% Magar, 9.2% Chhetri, 8.3% Newar, 7.8% Hill Brahmin, 5.8% Gharti/Bhujel, 5.4% Kami, 2.1% Damai/Dholi, 1.1% Badi, 1.0% Thakuri, 0.9% Tamang, 0.7% Chepang/Praja, 0.6% Musalman, 0.6% Sarki, 0.4% Kumal, 0.3% Kathabaniyan, 0.3% Rai, 0.2% Teli, 0.2% Tharu, 0.2% Yadav, 0.1% Bengali, 0.1% Hajam/Thakur, 0.1% Kalwar, 0.1% Mallaha, 0.1% Sanyasi/Dasnami, 0.1% Thakali and 0.6% others.

In terms of religion, 76.8% were Hindu, 18.6% Buddhist, 2.9% Christian, 0.5% Bon, 0.5% Muslim, 0.1% Prakriti and 0.6% others.

In terms of literacy, 75.0% could read and write, 1.7% could only read and 23.1% could neither read nor write.
