= Rupakot, Gandaki =

Rupakot, Gandaki may refer to:

- Rupakot, Kaski, in the Gandaki Pradesh of Nepal
- Rupakot, Tanahu, in the Gandaki Pradesh of Nepal
