= Samjur =

Coordinates: 28°04′22″N 84°20′09″E

Samjur (Nepali: सम्जुर) is a small village under Bhanu Municipality in Tanahun District, Nepal. The village is located northeast of its district headquarters Damauli with an elevation of 916 meters above sea level. The village is known for different castes and religions of people living together. Most of the villagers are farmers; however, some have their own jobs and businesses.
