= Thaprek =

Thaprek may refer to:

- Thaprek, Bagmati
- Thaprek, Gandaki
