= Rupakot =

Rupakot may refer to:

- Rupakot, Kaski in the Gandaki Zone of Nepal
- Rupakot, Tanahu in the Gandaki Zone of Nepal
- Rupakot, Lumbini, Nepal
