= Kedar Sigdel =

Nepali politician

- केदार सिग्देल

Member of Parliament, Pratinidhi Sabha
- In office 4 March 2018 – 18 September 2022
- Preceded by: Ram Chandra Paudel
- Succeeded by: Shankar Bhandari
- Constituency: Tanahun 2

Personal details
- Born: 5 September 1963 (age 62)
- Party: Communist Party of Nepal (Unified Marxist–Leninist)

Kedar Sigdel is a Nepali politician and former member of the House of Representatives.

He was elected under the first-past-the-post (FPTP) system from Tanahun–2 in the 2017 general election. He defeated his nearest rival Shankar Bhandari of Nepali Congress by acquiring 32,924 votes to Bhandari's 29,645. This was the first time he was elected to parliament.

Sigdel did not contest the seat in the 2022 general election, instead opting to run for the provincial assembly from Tanahun 2 (B), but he was defeated by Congress' Jeet Prakash Ale Magar by a margin of 640 votes.
