= Kumbale =

Kumbale may refer to:

- Kumbale, Kerala, a town in India
- Kumbale language, a language of Nepal
