= Ghansi =

Nepali grass-cutter

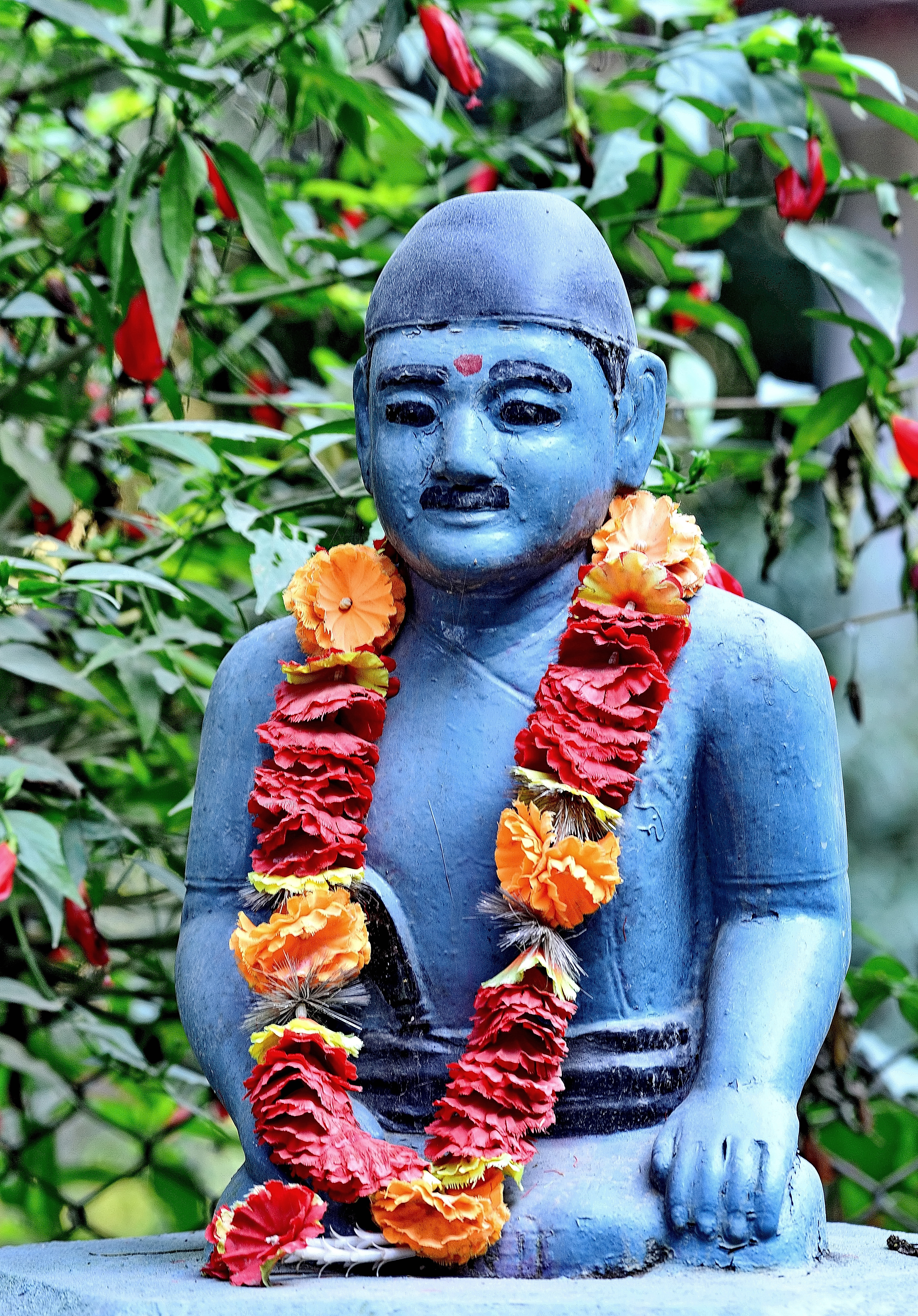
Statue of Ghansi in Ghansikuwa

Ghansi or Ghasi (Nepali: घाँसी) was a Nepali grasscutter who is best remembered for inspiring Bhanubhakta Acharya to translate the Sanskrit epic Ramayana into the Nepali language. He earned his living by cutting and selling grass. Ghansi constructed a well with the intention of being remembered after his death. Little is known about his life beyond the fact that he belonged to the Pantha caste and lived near the well. He has been portrayed by multiple actors in film, and the tourist destination Ghansikuwa was named after him.

== Life ==
One day, as Bhanubhakta Acharya sat on a stone slab in an unfrequented forest, he fell asleep while listening to birds chirping. When he awoke, he saw a person cutting grass. Acharya asked him about his whereabouts and Ghansi replied that he was a poor farmer who lived next to Acharya's village. He made money by cutting grass and selling it in the market. Ghansi told Acharya about his plan to build a well so that passers-by could be refreshed, and he could be remembered after his death.

His words had a great impact on Acharya, who wrote in a poem that the "grasscutter has taught me a great lesson", and he is credited as one of the inspirations for Acharya's translation of the Sanskrit epic Ramayana into the Nepali language.

भर् जन्म घाँस तिर मन् दिई धन कमायो
नाम क्यै रहोस् पछि भनेर कुवा खनायो ।
घाँसी दरिद्र घरको तर बुद्धि कस्तो
म भानुभक्त धनी भैकन किन यस्तो ।
मेरा ईनार न त सत्तल पाटिकै छन्
जे धन चीजहरु छन् घर भित्रनै छन् ।
त्यस घाँसीले कसरी आज दिए छ अर्ति
धिक्कार हो म कन बस्नु न राखि किर्ति ।

—Ghasi — Bhanubhakta Acharya
Translation:

Devoting his life to cutting grass, he earned some money, and wishing to be remembered dug a well.
The grasscutter is so poor. but what spirit!
And I, Bhanubhakta, have done nothing with my good fortune.
Of wells, inns or rest-houses I have made none. All my wealth lies at home.
And from this grasscutler, what do we learn?
That it's a shame to sit idle doing no good deed.

—Don Messerschmid, Gautam Yadama, Bhuvan Silwal

Ghansi built Ghasi Kuwa in Vyas Municipality near the Prithvi Highway. The well is awaiting preservation. According to the Bhanu Ghansi Memorial Park Conservation Committee, Ghansi belonged to the Pantha caste and lived near the well which he constructed. They added it was difficult to identify him due to Acharya not mentioning his name in his writings.

== Legacy ==
Ghansi was portrayed in several films. In Aadi Kabi Bhanubhakta (1999), he is portrayed by Rajpal Thapa. In Raat Chirnya Bhanu (2017), he is portrayed by Basudev Khanal. Additionally, in Tanahun District, there is a statue of Ghansi, as well as a statue of Bhanubhakta Acharya at Bhanu Ghansi Memorial Park. Ghansikuwa, a tourist destination in Tanahu District is named after Ghansi.

== See also ==
- Bhanubhakta Ramayana
