= Ghiring Sundhara =

Ghiring Sundhara घिरिङ सुन्धारा
- Village development committee
- Location in Nepal Ghiring Sundhara (Nepal)
- Coordinates: 27.895539°N 84.032603°E
- Country: Nepal
- Zone: Gandaki Zone
- District: Tanahun District

Population (1991)
  - Total: 7,242
- Time zone: UTC+5:45 (Nepal Time)

Ghiring Sundhara is a village development committee in Tanahun District in the Gandaki Zone of central Nepal. At the time of the 1991 Nepal census it had a population of 5524 people living in 1162 individual households.
