= Majhakot =

Majhakot may refer to:

- Majhakot, Gandaki, Nepal
- Majhakot, Rapti, Nepal
