= Ghiring Rural Municipality =

Administrative division in Gandaki, Nepal

Ghiring Rural Municipality घिरिङ्ग गाउँपालिका
- Gaunpalika
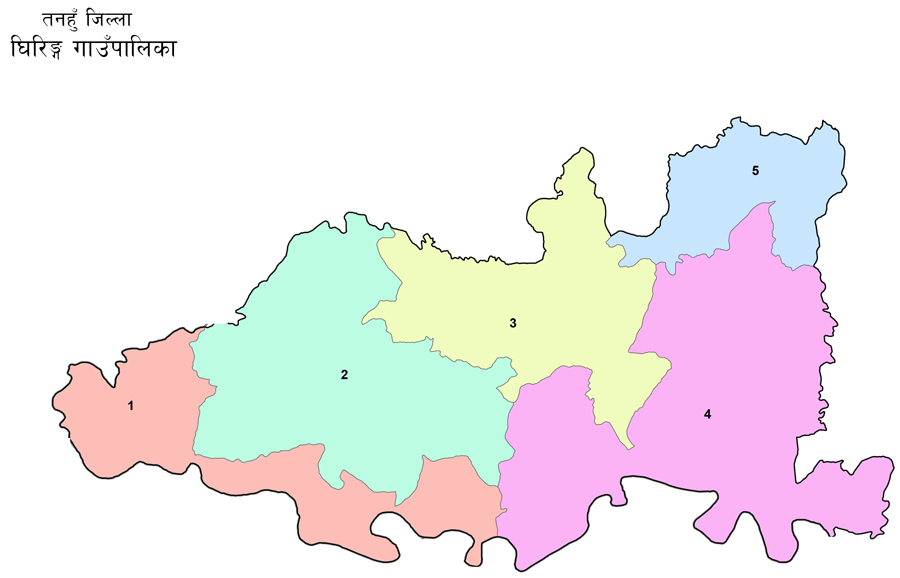
- Ghiring Gaunpalika (rural municipality), Nepal map

- Location in Nepal
- Coordinates: 28.065029°N 83.939057°E
- Country: Nepal
- Province: Gandaki
- District: Tanahun District

Population
  - Total: 19,318
- Time zone: UTC+5:45 (Nepal Time)
- Website: http://ghiringmun.gov.np

Ghiring Rural Municipality (Ghiring Gaupalika) (Nepali: घिरिङ्ग गाउँपालिका) is a Gaunpalika in Tanahaun District in Gandaki Province of Nepal. On 12 March 2017, the government of Nepal implemented a new local administrative structure, in which VDCs have been replaced with municipal and Village Councils. Ghiring is one of these 753 local units.

== Demographics ==
At the time of the 2011 Nepal census, Ghiring Rural Municipality had a population of 19,318. Of these, 48.0% spoke Magar, 42.6% Nepali, 7.5% Newar, 1.3% Gurung, 0.2% Bhojpuri, 0.1% Doteli, 0.1% Kumhali, 0.1% Maithili and 0.2% other languages as their first language.

In terms of ethnicity/caste, 50.7% were Magar, 10.1% Kami, 9.7% Kumal, 8.2% Newar, 4.9% Hill Brahmin, 4.8% Sarki, 3.5% Chhetri, 3.5% Damai/Dholi, 1.4% Gurung, 0.8% Darai, 0.5% Badi, 0.5% Gharti/Bhujel, 0.3% Sanyasi/Dasnami, 0.3% Thakuri, 0.3% Yadav, 0.1% Sunuwar, 0.1% Tharu and 0.2% others.

In terms of religion, 92.7% were Hindu, 6.3% Buddhist, 0.6% Christian, 0.1% Muslim and 0.4% others.

In terms of literacy, 67.5% could read and write, 1.7% could only read and 30.6% could neither read nor write.

== See also ==
- Dhakmar
