= Chhang =

Chhang may refer to:

- Chhaang, Himalayan beverage
- Chhang, Nepal, a village development committee
- Chhang Dawa Sherpa (born 1982), Nepalese mountaineer
- Youk Chhang (born 1961), Cambodian executive director

== See also ==
- Chang (disambiguation)
