= Kota, Nepal =

Kota, Nepal may refer to:

- Kot, Bhojpur
- Kota, Tanahun
