= Bhimad =

Bhimad भिमाद Bhimad Municipality
- Nickname: BHim Baad
- Location in Nepal Bhimad (Nepal)
- Coordinates: 28.00°N 84.07°E
- Country: Nepal
- Zone: Gandaki Zone
- District: Tanahu District

Government
  - Mayor: Dadhiraj Subedi (NCP)
  - Deputy Mayor: Sarada Khanal (NCP)

Population (2011)
  - Total: 8,414
- Time zone: UTC+5:45 (Nepal Time)
- Postal code: 33910
- Area code: 065
- Website: bhimadmun.gov.np

Bhimad is a municipality in Tanahu District in the Gandaki Zone of central Nepal. At the time of the 2011 Nepal census the city had a population of 8,414 people living in 2,191 individual households. It is 30 minutes away from Khairenitar. Due to its historic importance, a plan is underway to incorporate the Shukla Gandaki municipality and form the Bhimad Sub-metropolitan City in the near future. This is being done in order to improve the integrated development of this region because the city is currently experiencing accelerated development. While Bhimad lacks sufficient hospital facilities for its population size, there are many health centers in various communities.

== Demographics ==
At the time of the 2011 Nepal census, Bhimad Municipality had a population of 31,362. Of these, 51.1% spoke Nepali, 38.0% Magar, 5.3% Newar, 2.4% Gurung, 1.4% Urdu, 0.2% Bhojpuri, 0.2% Kumhali, 0.2% Rai, 0.1% Maithili, 0.1% Sign language, 0.1% Thakali and 0.1% other languages as their first language.

In terms of ethnicity/caste, 41.0% were Magar, 14.4% Hill Brahmin, 8.2% Kami, 6.8% Newar, 6.3% Sarki, 5.3% Damai/Dholi, 4.9% Thakuri, 2.6% Gurung, 2.6% Kumal, 2.2% Gharti/Bhujel, 2.1% Chhetri, 1.6% Musalman, 0.6% Badi, 0.3% Rai, 0.3% Sanyasi/Dasnami, 0.1% Sunuwar, 0.1% Tamang, 0.1% other Terai, 0.1% Thakali, 0.1% Tharu and 0.2% others.

In terms of religion, 91.0% were Hindu, 4.9% Buddhist, 1.6% Muslim, 1.2% Christian, 0.4% Bon, 0.1% Prakriti and 0.8% others.

In terms of literacy, 74.6% could read and write, 2.3% could only read and 23.0% could neither read nor write.

== Subedi Kulayan Temple, Lamindanda ==
The Subedi Kulayan Temple, Lamindanda is a spiritual temple and temple of the ancestral belief of all Subedi's community, that was established on the hill of the Lamindanda, Arunodaya of ward no 3 of Bhimad Municipality. It is located in between the Haidega, Phurunthan, Jaupani, Khudepani, Katanchhap and Mohoriya. Many Subedi's community and inherited offsprings spread all over the world, get united during the Kulayan Puja at this Temple.

== Simle ==
Simle is a famous and historical part of the Municipality. It is a growing commercial and economic hub near the Shuklgandaki Municipality. Construction of a motorway bridge from Dovan has been completed. Simle has 1 high school and 1 primary school. An expansion of the Community Health Unit in Simle is underway, which will make it the primary health center in the area with both outpatient and inpatient services. Landslide prevention, infrastructure development, and an urban development plan is currently the highest priorities of the town.

== International Center for the Rural Health ==
This has been a sought after institution with a training capacity in the rural medical facilities of Simle. Integrated health care with strong primary care base, will not only focus on curative treatment but will also provide preventative and promotional health services to the lesser fortunate population. It will also focus on research in the field of primary health care. Establishment of this institution is expected to transform the health care in this area and bring socioeconomic changes. It will be developed under the auspicious guidance of Guna Nidhi Khanal Memorial Trust. Trust has established a primary care out patient clinic which will support local marginalized population through charity health and subsidized health. Gandaki Wellness Center will focus on both outpatient charity health care to the local community.

== Late Shree Dilli Ram Khanal Airport ==
Late Shree Dilli Ram Khanal, was among the first settlers in Khanal area of Rang Rung (part of the municipality). He is remembered and preserved as a spiritual and philanthropic personality in this region. The Airport is being built in his memory and will enhance the tourism sector of this region, by providing access to the other major national and international cities. It is also expected to enhance robust economic changes in this area.

== Dhhandur Siddha Cave ==
One of the famous caves in the region, It is located in this municipality and is also a major tourist attraction. The cave has many impressions of the holy cow, shiva linga and other Gods and Goddesses. This prehistoric cave has been described as a meditation center for maharishis in the ancient era. Construction of a cable car service from Simle is underway for better accessibility for domestic and international tourists. But as of now a part has washed away and it is not completely safe

== Rangrung Hill Station ==
Rangrung is famous for its altitude, accessing panoramic views of the broad Himalayan range. Hill Tower with telescope facilities will be constructed in the near future. This is popular for the resorts and overnight stayers. It has enormous potential for paragliding, this area is also famous for biodiversity. It is easily accessible through roads from major cities.

== Ghrit Koushik Temple ==
Ghrit Koushik has been described as an enlightened rishi in Hindu mythology. New temple complex will be built at the Simle of the Municipality. The temple is located near the cave at Simle at the foot hill of the Rangrung Hill. The new temple will be expected to bring positive changes in the local communities.

== Dholikholso ==
It is located close to the Baiddhyapani of the municipality which is popular for its location and historical importance. Caves and cliffs at this location had been utilized for the palliative care and isolation of the malaria victims in its history. Utensils used by the victims has been safeguarded over the cliff. This is also a famous site for observation of stars in the universe during the daytime. This has been a popular tourist destination.

== Seti-Kyangdi Conservation project ==
Highly sought projects have been planned at the federal level to prevent landslides and enhance biodiversity along the banks of the Kyangdi Khola and Shukla Gandaki Rivers.The projects are expected to protect rapidly urbanized cities in this area.

== Simle-Putali Bazaar Economic Corridor ==
The proposed Simle-Putali Bazaar will connect the sub-metropolitan area with the district headquarters of Syangja, Putali Bazar. Development of this corridor has been in the works to enhance agriculture and animal husbandry in the region. It is expected to improve the socioeconomic status of the farmers to alleviate poverty and reduce international emigration of local residents.

== Guna Nidhi Khanal Memorial Trust ==
The Guna Nidhi Khanal Memorial Trust is a non-profit organisation that was established in the renowned social worker's memory. The trust provides scholarships to students from economically disadvantaged households and regularly conducts health camps to provide education, donates free medicines to marginalized population and empower health care workers.
