= Kabilas =

Kabilas may refer to:

- Kabilas, Gandaki, Nepal
- Kabilas, Narayani, Nepal
