= Bhirkot, Tanahu =

Bhirkot, Tanahu भीरकोट
- Village development committee
- Location in Nepal Bhirkot, Tanahu (Nepal)
- Coordinates: 27°51′35″N 84°13′51″E
- Country: Nepal
- Zone: Gandaki Zone
- District: Tanahu District

Population (2011)
  - Total: 5,014
- Time zone: UTC+5:45 (Nepal Time)

Bhirkot is a village development committee in Tanahu District in the Gandaki Zone of central Nepal. At the time of the 2011 Nepal census it had a population of 5014 people living in 1146 individual households. It lies northwest of Baidi. It lies on a steep mountain top overlooking a deep valley in which the Kali River passes. The village contains a health camp.
