= Myagde Rural Municipality =

Myagde Rural Municipality म्याग्दे गाउँपालिका
- Gaunpalika
- Location in Nepal
- Coordinates: 27.997031°N 84.164448°E
- Country: Nepal
- Province: Gandaki
- District: Tanahun District

Population
  - Total: 22,502
- Time zone: UTC+5:45 (Nepal Time)
- Website: http://myagdemun.gov.np/

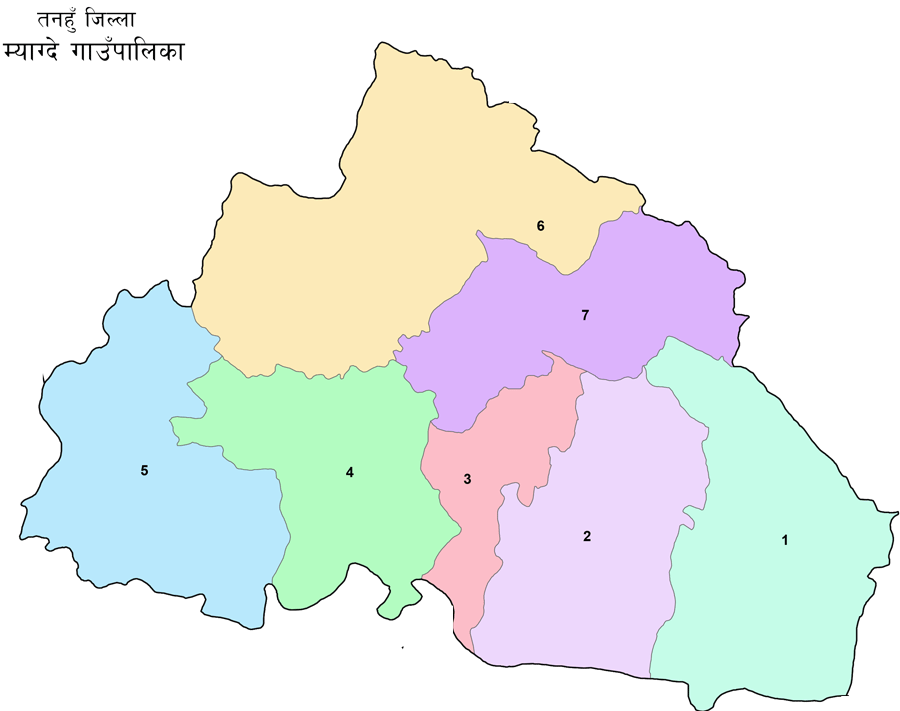

Myagde Rural Municipality (Myagde Gaupalika) (Nepali: म्याग्दे गाउँपालिका) is a Gaunpalika in Tanahaun District in Gandaki Province of Nepal. On 12 March 2017, the government of Nepal implemented a new local administrative structure, in which VDCs have been replaced with municipal and Village Councils. Myagde is one of these 753 local units.

== Demographics ==
At the time of the 2011 Nepal census, Myagde Rural Municipality had a population of 22,502. Of these, 67.0% spoke Nepali, 22.3% Magar, 7.2% Newar, 2.7% Gurung, 0.1% Bhojpuri, 0.1% Kumhali, 0.1% Tamang, 0.1% Tharu, 0.1% Urdu and 0.2% other languages as their first language.

In terms of ethnicity/caste, 31.9% were Magar, 11.9% Kami, 11.6% Newar, 10.8% Chhetri, 9.1% Hill Brahmin, 6.4% Sarki, 4.5% Damai/Dholi, 3.8% Gurung, 3.7% Thakuri, 2.3% Kumal, 0.9% Gharti/Bhujel, 0.8% Badi, 0.5% Sanyasi/Dasnami, 0.3% Khawas, 0.3% Tamang, 0.1% Gaine, 0.1% Majhi, 0.1% Musalman, 0.1% Rai, 0.1% other Terai, 0.1% Tharu and 0.4% others.

In terms of religion, 95.6% were Hindu, 3.1% Buddhist, 0.9% Christian, 0.1% Muslim and 0.3% others.

In terms of literacy, 75.6% could read and write, 1.9% could only read and 22.3% could neither read nor write.
