= Rishing Rural Municipality =

Rishing Rural Municipality ऋषिङ्ग गाउँपालिका
- Gaunpalika
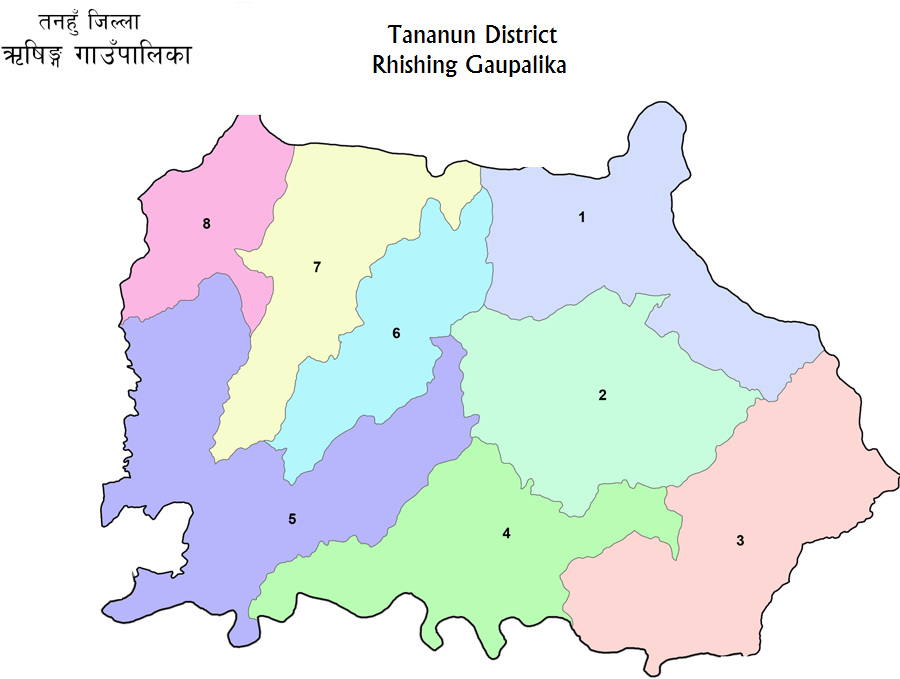
- Rishing Gaunpalika, Nepal

- Location in Nepal
- Coordinates: 27.922313°N 84.177882°E
- Country: Nepal
- Province: Gandaki
- District: Tanahun District

Government
  - Chairperson: Rajendra Krishna Shrestha

Population
  - Total: 25,870
- Time zone: UTC+5:45 (Nepal Time)
- Website: https://rishingmun.gov.np/

Rishing Rural Municipality (Rishing Gaupalika) (Nepali: ऋषिङ्ग गाउँपालिका) is a Gaunpalika in Tanahaun District in Gandaki Province of Nepal. On 12 March 2017, the government of Nepal implemented a new local administrative structure, in which VDCs have been replaced with municipal and Village Councils. Rishing is one of these 753 local units.

== Demographics ==
At the time of the 2011 Nepal census, Rishing Rural Municipality had a population of 25,870. Of these, 63.8% spoke Magar, 29.1% Nepali, 3.0% Newar, 1.7% Darai, 1.3% Gurung, 0.3% Bhojpuri, 0.1% Kumhali, 0.1% Maithili, 0.1% Sign language, 0.1% Urdu and 0.1% other languages as their first language.

In terms of ethnicity/caste, 65.2% were Magar, 6.9% Kami, 6.7% Chhetri, 4.4% Sarki, 3.7% Newar, 2.9% Thakuri, 2.2% Damai/Dholi, 1.7% Darai, 1.3% Gurung, 1.2% Badi, 1.2% Hill Brahmin, 0.8% Kumal, 0.5% Sanyasi/Dasnami, 0.3% Bote, 0.3% Gharti/Bhujel, 0.3% Majhi, 0.1% Musalman, 0.1% other Terai and 0.2% others.

In terms of religion, 93.1% were Hindu, 5.3% Buddhist, 1.3% Christian, 0.1% Muslim, 0.1% Prakriti and 0.2% others.

In terms of literacy, 66.4% could read and write, 2.5% could only read and 31.1% could neither read nor write.
