= Vyas Municipality =

Municipality in Gandaki Province, Nepal

Vyas व्यास
- Municipality (नगरपालिका)
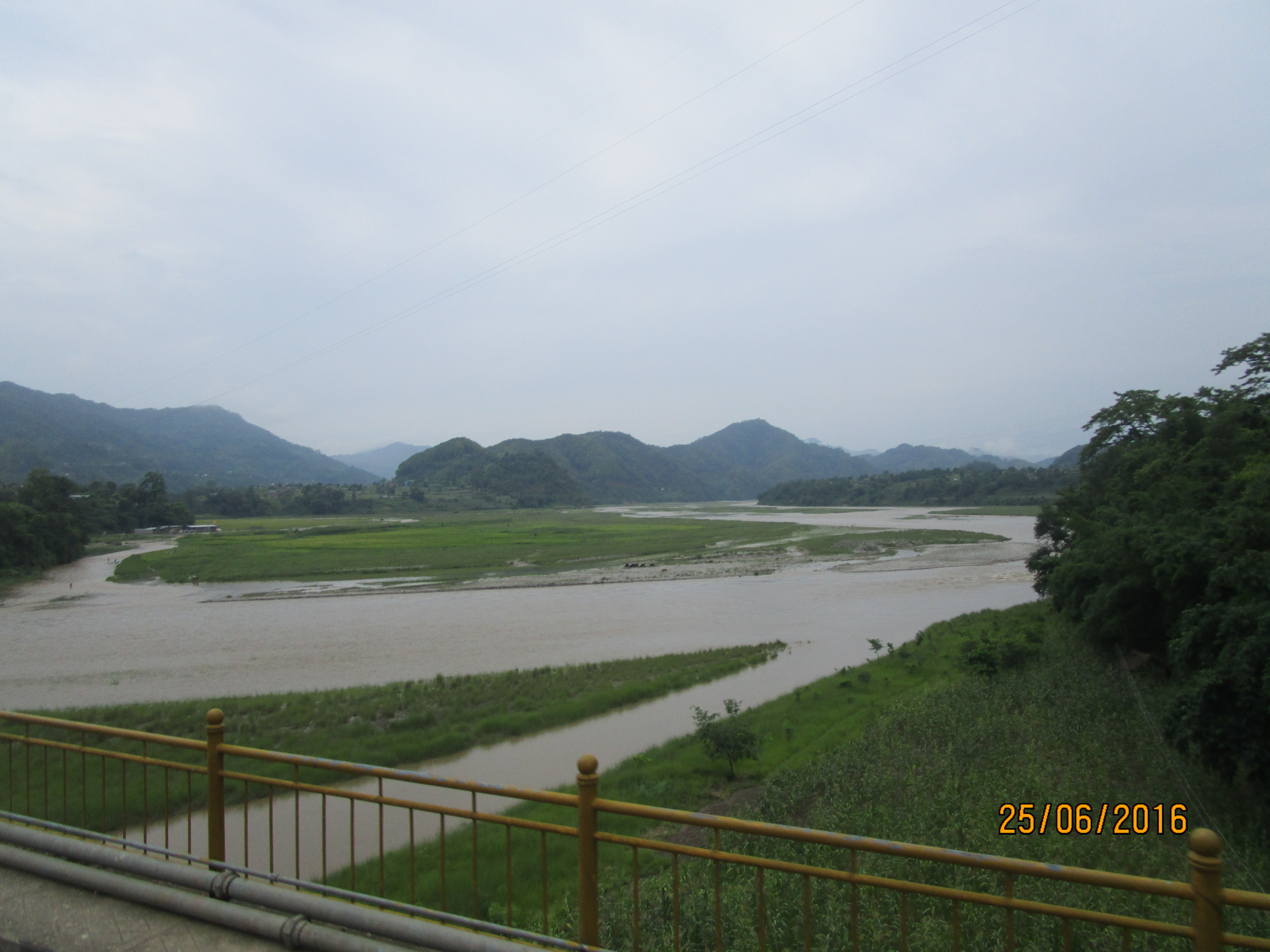
- Madi River at Damauli
- Motto: विविधतायुक्त गाउँ-शहर, समृद्द मेरो व्यास नगर
- Location in Nepal Vyas (Nepal)
- Coordinates: 27°58′35″N 84°16′05″E
- Country: Nepal
- Province: Gandaki
- District: Tanahun

Government
  - Mayor: Baikuntha Neupane (NC)
  - Deputy Mayor: Indira Darai (NC)

Area
  - Total: 86 km^{2} (33 sq mi)

Population (2011)
  - Total: 70,335
  - Density: 820/km^{2} (2,100/sq mi)

Languages
- Time zone: UTC+5:45 (NST)
- Postal code: 33900
- Website: http://vyasmun.gov.np/

Vyas, also spelled Byas (Nepali: व्यास) is a municipality of Tanahun District located in Gandaki Province in Nepal and incorporates the village Damauli, the district headquarters, for which the municipality is also often referred to as Damauli. The municipality was established by merging the former Village development committee Damauli with several of its neighbors, the most recent merger being the one with Pokhari Bhanjyang in 2014. It lies on the bank of Madi Khola.

It is one of the municipalities, which could be formed after the re-establishment of multiparty democracy in 1991 A.D. At the time of the 2011 Nepal census, it had a population of 70,335 people living in 18,339 individual households.

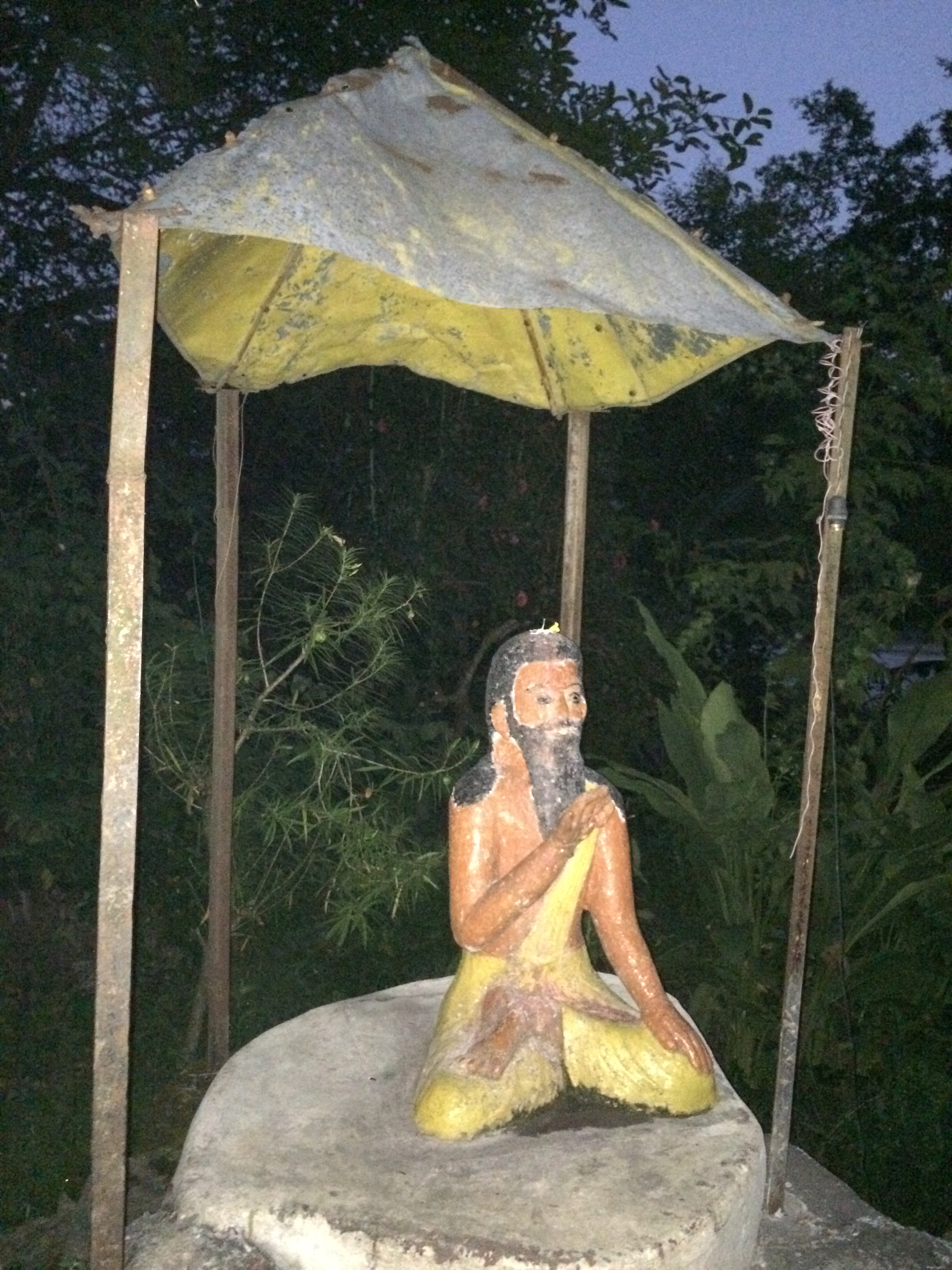
Statue of the Vedic Rishi Veda Vyasa on the river bank at the confluence of the Madi and Seti rivers.

Many scriptures including Himwat khanda of Skanda purana mentions that Sage Vedavyasha was born in an island nearby confluence of two Gandaki rivers, (माद्रिका शुक्लगण्डक्यो:संगमे) which lies in a present day Damauli city of Tanahun district in Nepal. After his name, the municipality was named as Vyash nagarpalika.

== Demographics ==
At the time of the 2011 Nepal census, Vyas Municipality had a population of 71,051. Of these, 64.7% spoke Nepali, 14.7% Magar, 6.6% Gurung, 4.7% Newar, 4.6% Darai, 1.0% Urdu, 0.8% Bote, 0.6% Bhojpuri, 0.5% Tamang, 0.4% Dura, 0.3% Maithili, 0.2% Chepang, 0.2% Hindi, 0.1% Bhujel, 0.1% Kumhali, 0.1% Rai, 0.1% Tharu and 0.1% other languages as their first language.

In terms of ethnicity/caste, 20.1% were Magar, 15.4% Hill Brahmin, 13.1% Chhetri, 8.5% Gurung, 8.1% Newar, 7.9% Kami, 4.9% Darai, 4.2% Sarki, 3.7% Damai/Dholi, 2.2% Gharti/Bhujel, 2.0% Kumal, 1.9% Musalman, 1.9% Thakuri, 1.2% Bote, 1.1% Dura, 1.0% Sanyasi/Dasnami, 0.7% Tamang, 0.3% Chepang/Praja, 0.3% Rai, 0.2% Badi, 0.2% other Dalit, 0.1% Kathabaniyan, 0.1% Teli, 0.1% Tharu, 0.1% Yadav and 0.2% others.

In terms of religion, 88.8% were Hindu, 6.0% Buddhist, 2.1% Christian, 1.8% Muslim, 0.5% Prakriti, 0.4% Bon and 0.4% others.

In terms of literacy, 79.9% could read and write, 2.0% could only read and 18.0% could neither read nor write.

== Ward Profile ==
There are 14 wards in Vyas Municipality:

Vyas Municipality Ward Profile
Present Ward	Former Municipality/VDC	Former Ward	Ward Chairman
1	Vyas	1	Ramesh Chandra Hadkhale
2	Vyas	2	Kashiram Shrestha
3	Vyas	10	Anup Rana
4	Vyas	11	Man Bahadur Gurung
5	Vyas	6,7,8	Bishnu Kumar Shrestha
6	Shyamgha V.D.C		Jiwan Gurung
7	Kyamin V.D.C,	1,3,7-9	Krishna Prashad Neupane
8	Kyamin V.D.C and Risti V.D.C	6, 1-5,7-9	Yuwaraj Gurung
9	Kyamin V.D.C, Tanahunsur V.D.C, Satiswara V.D.C	(2,4,5),(6,7,8),(6,9)	Suresh Thapa
10	Vyas	5,9	Khemraj Pokhrel
11	Vyas, Ghansikuwa V.D.C, Tanahunsur V.D.C	(3,4),(6),(4,5,7,9)	Dal Bahadur Dura
12	Ghasikuwa V.D.C	2-5,7,8	Bam Bahadur Ale
13	Vyas	12,13,14	Basanta Ale
14	Keshavtar	2-7	Kaji Man Shrestha

== Media ==
To promote local culture Vyas has four FM radio stations. That are Radio Bhanubhakta, Damauli F.M, Smart F.M, and Madi Seti FM, all of which are community radio stations.

== Transportation ==
Vyas lies on Prithvi Rajmarg, a highway from Kathmandu to Pokhara.
