= Samungbhagawati =

Coordinates: 27.9039°N 84.0907°E

Samungbhagawati समुङ भगवती
- Village development committee
- Location in Nepal Samungbhagawati (Nepal)
- Country: Nepal
- Zone: Gandaki Zone
- District: Tanahu District

Population (1991)
  - Total: 7,740
- Time zone: UTC+5:45 (Nepal Time)

Samungbhagawati is a village development committee in Tanahu District in the Gandaki Zone of central Nepal. At the time of the 1991 Nepal census it had a population of 7740 people living in 1239 individual households.
