= Bhanumati, Nepal =

Bhanumati, Nepal भानुमती DHANDUR Siddha cave
- Village development committee
- Location in Nepal Bhanumati, Nepal (Nepal)
- Coordinates: 28.00°N 84.02°E
- Country: Nepal
- Zone: Gandaki Zone
- District: Tanahu District

Population (2011)
  - Total: 4,642
- Time zone: UTC+5:45 (Nepal Time)

Bhanumati, Nepal is a village development committee in Tanahu District in the Gandaki Zone of central Nepal. At the time of the 2011 Nepal census it had a population of 4642 people living in 1147 individual households.
