= Bhirlung =

Mirlung मिर्लुङ
- Village Development Committee
- Location in Nepal Mirlung (Nepal)
- Coordinates: 28.09°N 84.37°E
- Country: Nepal
- Zone: Gandaki Zone
- District: Tanahu District

Population (1991)
  - Total: 6,840
- Time zone: UTC+5:45 (Nepal Time)

Mirlung is a village development committee in Tanahun District in the Gandaki Zone of central Nepal. At the time of the 1991 Nepal census it had a population of 6840 people living in 1439 individual households.

it should be a mirlung
