= Jamune Bhanjyang =

Jamune जामुने
- Village development committee
- Location in Nepal Jamune (Nepal)
- Coordinates: 27.98°N 84.21°E
- Country: Nepal
- Zone: Gandaki Zone
- District: Tanahu District

Population (1991)
  - Total: 8,326
- Time zone: UTC+5:45 (Nepal Time)

Jamune (Nepali: जामुने) was a former Village Development Committee (VDC) in Tanahun District of the former Gandaki Zone of Nepal. According to the 1991 Nepal census, it had a population of 8,326 people living in 1,570 individual households.

Following the restructuring of local government in Nepal in 2017, the VDC system was abolished and the territory of Jamune was incorporated into Myagde Rural Municipality in Tanahun District, Gandaki Province.

Myagde Rural Municipality was formed through the merger of the former Village Development Committees of Jamune, Chhang and Manpang, with its headquarters located in Chhang, and is divided into seven wards.

The area is known for orange cultivation, and agriculture remains an important source of livelihood for local residents.
