= Ranipokhari, Nepal =

Coordinates: 27.9472°N 84.1488°E

Ranipokhari, Nepal रानीपोखरी
- Village development committee
- Location in Nepal Ranipokhari, Nepal (Nepal)
- Country: Nepal
- Zone: Gandaki Zone
- District: Tanahu District

Population (1991)
  - Total: 2,984
- Time zone: UTC+5:45 (Nepal Time)

Ranipokhari, Nepal is a village development committee in Tanahu District in the Gandaki Zone of central Nepal. At the time of the 1991 Nepal census it had a population of 2984 people living in 510 individual households.
