= Raipur, Nepal =

Raipur, Nepal राइपुर
- Municipality
- Location in Nepal Raipur, Nepal (Nepal)
- Coordinates: 28.06°N 83.97°E
- Country: Nepal
- Province: Gandaki Province
- District: Tanahu District

Population (1991)
  - Total: 4,581
- Time zone: UTC+5:45 (Nepal Time)

Raipur (राइपुर) is part of Shuklagandaki (Nepali: शुक्लगण्डकी) Municipality in Tanahu District of Gandaki Province [Province No. 4], in central Nepal. The whole previous Raipur Village Development Committee (तत्कालिन राइपुर गा. बि. स.) is now included as the Ward No 11 of Shuklagandaki Municipality (शुक्लागण्डकी नगरपालिका) in March 2017. The head of the Raipur Ward No 11 is Shalikram Bhattarai. According to the Population Census of 1991, it had a population of 4581 people living in 850 individual households. Raipur is situated in about 18 km west from Dulegaunda Town & about 15 km from Putalibazar of Syangja District. From this village Of the top part called Raipurkot, we can have a panoramic view of Annapurna and Dhaulagiri Macchapuchre Range in the north, green hills, fertile land in the river banks, terraces and many others places with seasonal fruits and vegetables. The lifestyle of people living in Raipur is simple, and the majority of them are farmers. Most of the people from Raipur are migrated to Dulegaunda, Belchautara, Dhorfridi, Pokhara, Syangja, Chitwan, Kathmandu and other urban areas. About 90% of youths of Raipur are at Third Countries and Gulf for unskilled and low skilled employments.. Recently the village is connected with the national grid of electricity network. Not all the areas of Raipur has good drinking water facilities. People, in the hillside such as Bishauna, Chilaunekhark, Baaspani (Gaunpahal), Thumkidada, Simleshwara, Samtari, Bangalekhola have to spend most of their morning time in collecting drinking water from pond.

== Hospitals ==
Located 15 km away from Dulegaunda in Sankhe, the 15 bed Phoolbari Community Hospital has an MBBS doctor, a nurse, health assistants, laboratory technicians including caretakers to attend to the needs of the patients visiting the hospital for treatment. The hospital has been providing 24-hour emergency service, out-patient department, infant and maternity services along with treatment facilities such as x-ray and ultrasound. With the establishment of the hospital, locals have been able to access medical service within the village itself.. The credit of setting up of this hospital goes to Mr. Tanka Paudel, who collected donations and other grants from various helping hands and on its full operations he handed over the hospital to the Government of Nepal.

== Transportation ==
This village has access to Prithivi Highway and Siddhartha Highway within a single hour via recently constructed country roads. Thumkidaada, Bisauna, Bajhakhet, Odare are the hubs in Raipur, where local jeeps are available for Dulegaunda and Syangja Bazar. However, the public transportation is not frequent and easy to access as the local Jeeps make people to wait for hours in Dulegauda or in Syangja to board. Suklagandaki Municipality needs to think on this issue seriously and bring forward the concept of City Bus service to the people living in the remote areas like in Raipur.

== Education ==
Raipur used to be famous for its wisdom during the Panchayat time and early stage of democracy as people were very conscious in educating their children. There are many educational establishments set up by the public efforts in Raipur, but nowadays many parents are taking their children out to Pokhara, Dulegauda, Syangja and other urban areas' private boarding schools because of the poor education quality and poor facilities available in the local Government schools. Some schools are in the verge of collapse due to the very low student number. People from Raipur expect to pay a proper attention from the Municipality Office and concerned Government authorities to enhance the infrastructure and quality of school education.
