= Syamgha =

Coordinates: 28.0726°N 84.2173°E

- Village development committee
- Location in Nepal Syamgha (Nepal)
- Country: Nepal
- Zone: Gandaki Zone
- District: Tanahu District

Population (1991)
  - Total: 5,532
- Time zone: UTC+5:45 (Nepal Time)

Syamgha is a village development committee in Tanahu District in the Gandaki Zone of central Nepal. At the time of the 1991 Nepal census it had a population of 5532 people living in 1070 individual households.
