= Ghansikuwa =

Ghansikuwa घाँसीकुवा
- Famous Tourist Destination
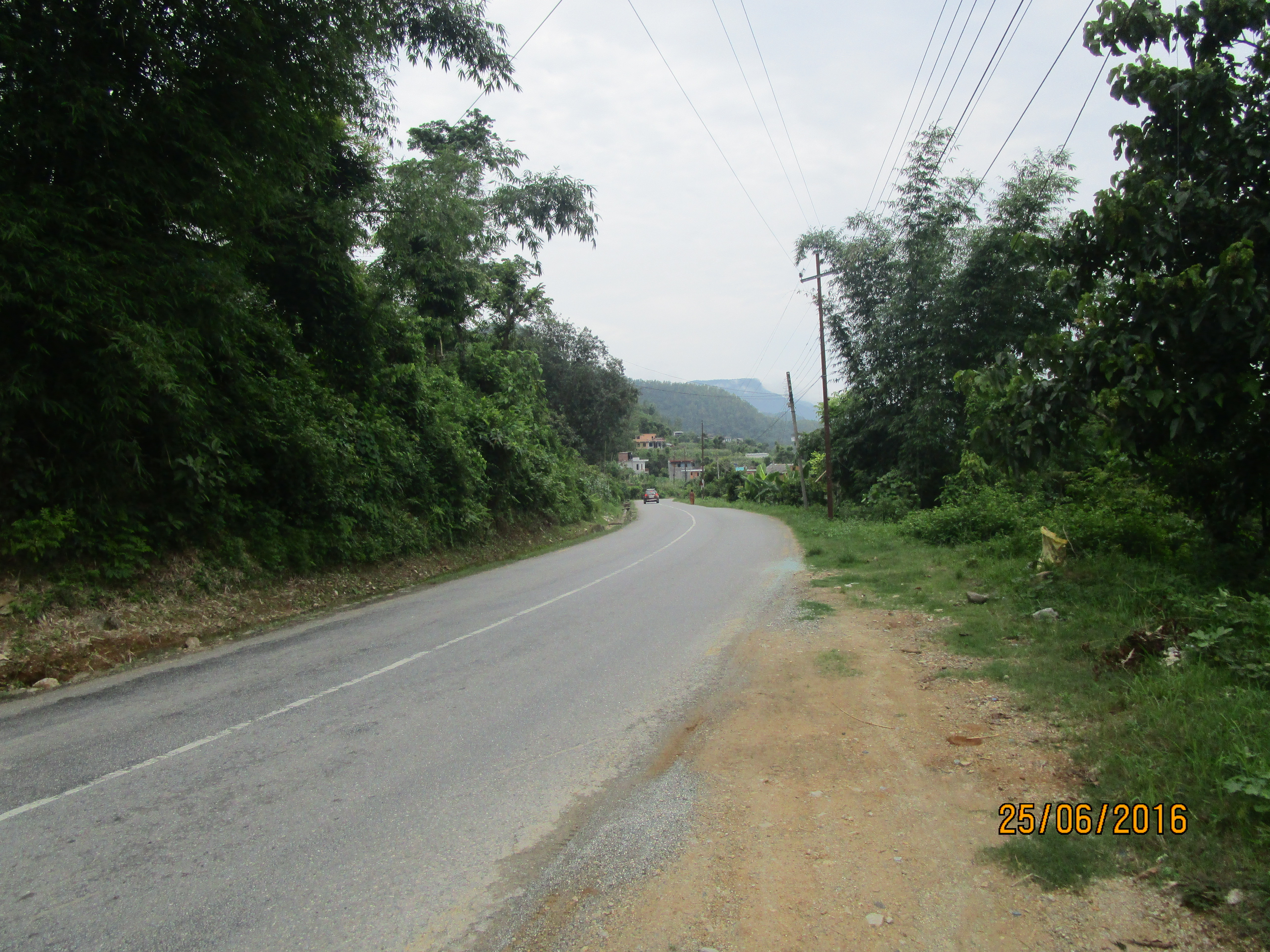
- Prithvi Highway at Ghansikuwa

- Location in Nepal Ghansikuwa (Nepal)
- Coordinates: 27.97°N 84.36°E
- Country: Nepal
- Zone: Gandaki Zone
- District: Tanahu District

Population (1991)
  - Total: 6,573
- Time zone: UTC+5:45 (Nepal Time)

Ghansikuwa is a famous tourist destination in Tanahu District in the Gandaki Zone of Gandaki Province, Nepal. It is famous for a pond constructed by Ghansi, a local who worked as grass cutter. Bhanubhakta was inspired by the activity of the Ghanshi, so he has noticeably mentioned him in his creations. Today, you can see the statues of Bhanubhakta and Ghanshi, inside the park premises and the well preserved pond, left to the park. The cool air flowing from the nearby Chisaudi Khola and easy access to the place, has made the place an attractive travel destination during weekends.

Kamalbari: Just 2 kilometers ride in the Prithivi Highway, east to the area lies Kamalbari, is another famous tourist destination in the district. Mt. Manaslu and the surrounding hills can be seen nearby. It is the entrance to the trekking route of Chabdi Barahi Temple and Sera-Tanahusur hiking route.
