= Pokhari Bhanjyang =

Coordinates: 27°57′N 84°18′E

Pokhari Bhanjyang पोखरी भञ्ज्याङ
- Village development committee
- Location in Nepal Pokhari Bhanjyang (Nepal)
- Country: Nepal
- Zone: Gandaki Zone
- District: Tanahun District

Population (1991)
  - Total: 4,082
- Time zone: UTC+5:45 (Nepal Time)

Pokhari Bhanjyang is a village development committee in Tanahun District in the Gandaki Zone of central Nepal. At the time of the 1991 Nepal census it had a population of 4082.
