= Kihun =

Kihun किहुँ
- Village development committee
- Location in Nepal Kihun (Nepal)
- Coordinates: 27.94°N 83.99°E
- Country: Nepal
- Zone: Gandaki Zone
- District: Tanahu District

Population (1991)
  - Total: 4,448
- Time zone: UTC+5:45 (Nepal Time)

Kihun is a village development committee in Tanahu District in the Gandaki Zone of central Nepal. At the time of the 1991 Nepal census it had a population of 4448 people living in 811 individual households.
