= Nara Nath Acharya =

Nepalese poet (1906 - 1988)

Pandit, Kaviraj Nara Nath Acharya
- नरनाथ आचार्य
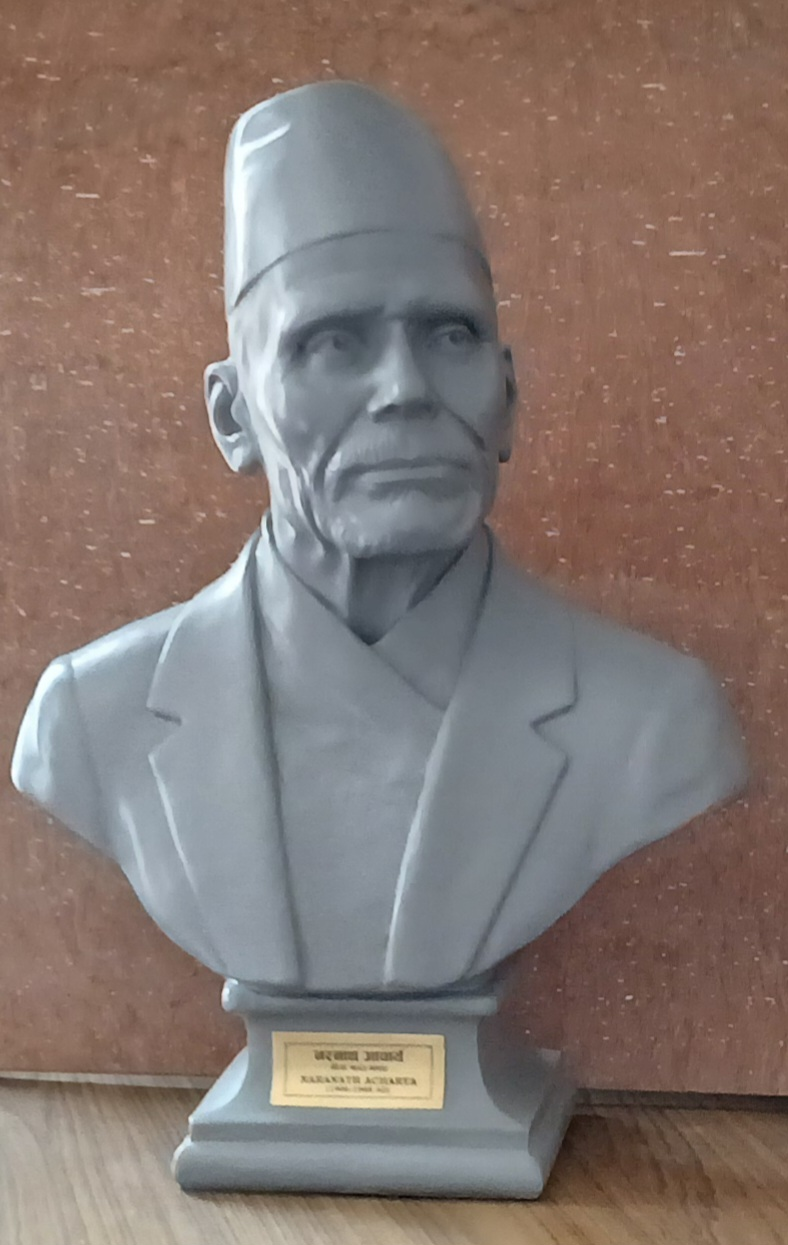
- Born: 1 April 1906; Tanahun, Nepal
- Died: 7 May 1988 (aged 82); Kathmandu, Nepal
- Education: Bachelor's in Ayurveda
- Occupations: Kaviraj (Ayurvedic Physician), writer, poet
- Years active: 1926–1988
- Notable work: Biography of Adikavi Bhanubhakta Acharya
- Spouse: Gangamaya Devi
- Children: 9
- Relatives: Bhanubhakta Acharya (Grand uncle); Narahari Acharya (Nephew); Gyan Chandra Acharya (Grand nephew)

Pandit Kaviraj Nara Nath Acharya (1906–1988) was a Nepalese Pandit (Sanskrit Scholar), Kaviraj (Ayurvedic physician) and writer in Sanskrit and Nepali. He is best known for his biography of his great-uncle, the poet Bhanubhakta Acharya, first published in 1960.

His biography of Bhanubhakta came after the one by Motiram Bhatta (1866–1896), the first biographer of Bhanubhakta. He elaborated upon Bhanubhakta's works and publishing many of the poet's work for the first time. He had published the historical facsimile of Bhanubhakta's letters for the first time.

== Early life ==
Naranath Acharya was born on 1 April 1906 while his father Lokanath Acharya (1870–1907) was far away in Taplejung in eastern Nepal working as a clerk in a government office but he died in Banaras where he had gone to bathe in the holy Ganges on the occasion of the first day of the month of Magh when the sun moves into the house of Capricorn, which happened to be on a Monday with no moon and solar eclipse that year. There were pilgrims from all over India and the overcrowded city was filthy and Lokanath caught cholera and succumbed to it.

Acharya learned the alphabet from his older brother Umanath Acharya (1900–1960) and he began to memorize Amarakosha, the lexicon of Sanskrit in verse, even as he worked with his mother. Acharya went through the ceremony of Bratabandha on April 17, 1913. Then he started to read Hindu religious texts such as Candī, Rudrī, Laghukaumudī, Hitopadesha,Raghuvamsha and other books under the guidance of his uncle Bishwanath. He would run away from home to Kathmandu four days on foot to give the exams of his studies. Then in 1921 Naranath was selected to live in a hostel for free food and education at Tindhara Sanskrit Pathashala.

== Marriage ==
Acharya got married at age 19 on 25 February 1925 to Ganga Maya Devi (Wagley) who was just nine years old at that time. He continued to study and went to Banaras in February 1927 and passed the exam of Madhyamā (Intermediate) of Sanskrit Grammar. Then he went to Kathmandu to study Hindu astrology too. But then the government opened a primary school in Langdi, Sihrachowk Gorkha and he was interviewed and told that he would get a letter of appointment at home. But then his mother died just a few days before he could join his job. He could not continue teaching because of his poor health. He came back home and quit the job in December 1930.

== Ayurvedic Physician ==
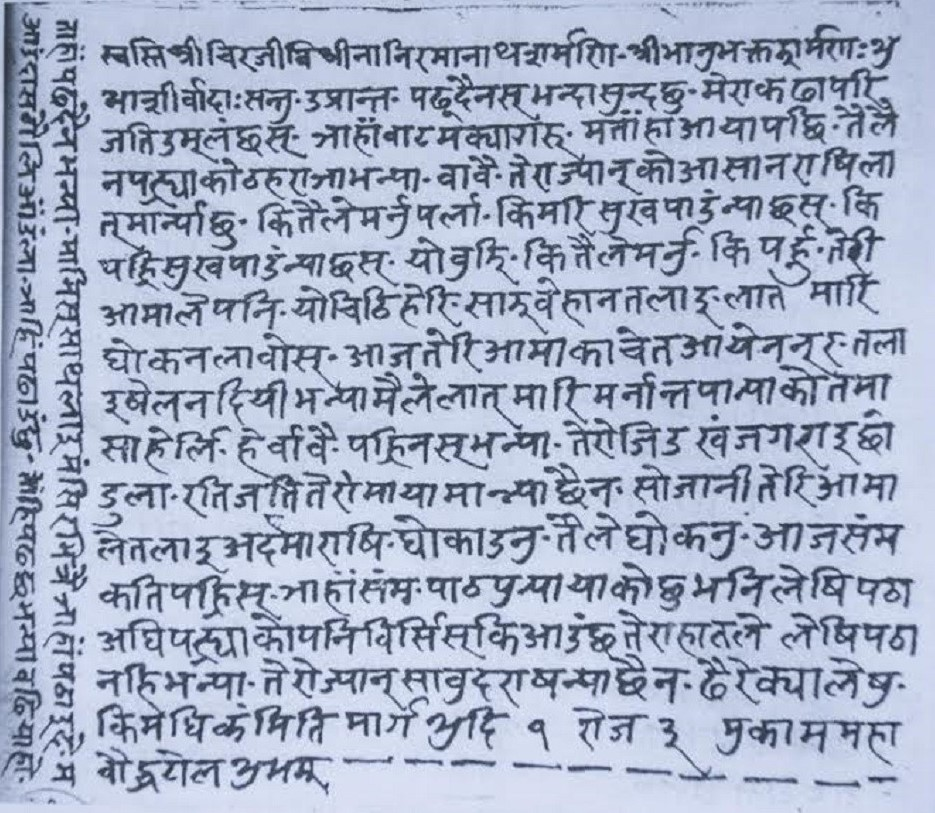
Letter of Bhanubhakta Acharya to his son (1858), First published by Nara Natha Acharya in 1960 in his book

He decided to study Ayurveda in Kathmandu and graduated with a bachelor’s degree in 1931 and continued to study for the master’s degree (Acharya) in it. But early in 1933 the government decided to open an Ayurvedic dispensary in Bandipur, the district headquarters of Tanahu that was close to Naranath’s home, so he went to his posting in Bandipur on May 14, 1933. Then he was transferred to many places such as Tarkughat (1947), Myagdey (1950), Shyamgha (1952), Myagdey (1956), Manakamana (1959), Myagdey (1959), Japagadi, Palpa (1960) and Tuhure Pasal (1961). He retired in 1973.

== Works ==
His other published books are listed below.

- Vadhu Rakshā (Nepali:वधूरक्षा) (In Defense of the Daughters-in-law), SatyaHarischandrakatha and Subhashitsangraha (सत्य हरिश्चन्द्रकथा तथा सुभाषितसंग्रह) (In a single book, 1959)
- Ādikavi Kavisamrat Bhānubhakta Ācāryako saccā jı̄vanacarittra (Nepali:आदिकवि कविसम्राट् भासनुभक्त आचार्यको सच्चा जीवनचरित्र) (First Edition 1960, Second Edition 1979)
- Lakshahom Yajyako Varnan (Nepali:लक्षहोम यज्ञको वर्णन) (1961)
- Lakshahuti Pancadasi (लक्षाहुतिपञ्चदशी) (First and Second, 1976)
- Kavita Sangraha (Nepali: कविता संग्रह, lit. 'Collection of Poems'; 1983)
- Padyamālā (Nepali: पद्यमाला, lit. 'Garland of verses'; Collections of Poems; 1983)
- Caturasitipujavidhih (Sanskrit: चतुरशीतिपूजाविधि) (Ritual methods for celebrating 84 years, Published posthumously in 2006)

== Children and death ==
Acharya had seven sons: Bhoj Raj (1935–1953), Shiva Raj (1941–2017), Samba Raj (1943), Bishwa Raj (1945), Jaya Raj (1951), Bijaya Raj (1954) and Soma Raj (1957) and two daughters: Hari Maya Paudel (1938) and Durga Devi (1948–1957).

He died on 7 May 1988 at Pashupati Aryaghat in Kathmandu.
