= Gajarkot =

Gajarkot गाजरकोट
- Village development committee
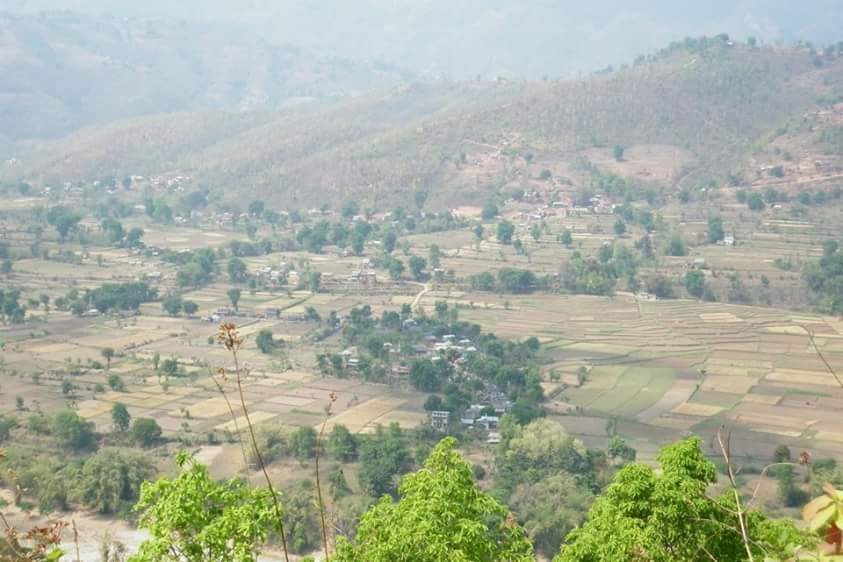
- View of Gajarkot Baindi from Bhalayatar.

- Location in Nepal Gajarkot (Nepal)
- Coordinates: 27.88°N 83.98°E
- Country: Nepal
- Zone: Gandaki Zone
- District: Tanahu District

Population (1991)
  - Total: 5,385
- Time zone: UTC+5:45 (Nepal Time)

[Gajarkot] is a village development committee in Tanahu District in the Gandaki Zone of central Nepal. At the time of the 1991 Nepal census it had a population of 5385 people living in 983 individual households. It contains 9 wards. Ward No.: 1 »» Kathekot, Ward No.: 2 »» Katahre, Ward No.: 3 »» Dumkot, Ward No.: 4&5 »» Putgau & Puttar, Ward No.: 6 »» Attrouli, Ward No.: 7 »» Baindi, Ward No.: 8 »» Gajarkot., & Ward No.: 9 »» Dumrebesi.

The community here consist of mixed type. Magar and Newar are in majority in Kathekot and Dumkot while Brahman and Kshetri are in majority in Baindi, Dumribesi, Atrouli and Puttar. A cannel from local Maidi Khola is dug that irrigates the plain land of Baindi, Bhantar, Atrouli and Puttar. A small cannel (Nahar) dug by the Khanal family around 2020 BS irrigates the fields of Baindi.
