= Kotdarbar =

Kotdarbar कोतदरवार
- Village development committee
- Location in Nepal Kotdarbar (Nepal)
- Coordinates: 27.92°N 84.20°E
- Country: Nepal
- Zone: Gandaki Zone
- District: Tanahu District

Population (1991)
  - Total: 5,565
- Time zone: UTC+5:45 (Nepal Time)

Kotdarbar is a village development committee in Tanahu District in the Gandaki Zone of central Nepal. At the time of the 1991 Nepal census, it had a population of 5565 people living in 836 individual households.
