= Ramjakot =

Ramjakot रम्जाकोट
- Village development committee
- Location in Nepal Ramjakot (Nepal)
- Coordinates: 27.87°N 84.14°E
- Country: Nepal
- Zone: Gandaki Zone
- District: Tanahu District

Population (1991)
  - Total: 3,821
- Time zone: UTC+5:45 (Nepal Time)

Ramjakot is a village development committee in Tanahu District in the Gandaki Zone of central Nepal. At the time of the 1991 Nepal census it had a population of 3821 people living in 596 individual households.
