= Kyamin =

Kyamin क्यामिन
- Village development committee
- Location in Nepal Kyamin (Nepal)
- Coordinates: 28.06°N 84.27°E
- Country: Nepal
- Zone: Gandaki Zone
- District: Tanahu District

Population (1991)
  - Total: 5,483
- Time zone: UTC+5:45 (Nepal Time)

Kyamin is a village development committee in Tanahu District in the Gandaki Zone of central Nepal. At the time of the 1991 Nepal census it had a population of 5483 people living in 1087 individual households.
