= Shankar Bhandari =

Nepalese politician

Honourable Shankar Bhandari
- शंकर भण्डारी

Member of Parliament, Pratinidhi Sabha
- Incumbent
- Assumed office 22 December 2022
- Succeeded by: Shreeram Neupane
- Constituency: Tanahun 2

Personal details
- Born: 23 May 1968 (age 57) Tanahun District
- Party: Nepali Congress
- Spouse: Anjana Upreti
- Parent: Dayanidhi Bhandari (father)

Shankar Bhandari is a Nepalese politician, belonging to the Nepali Congress currently serving as a member of the 2nd Federal Parliament of Nepal. In the 2022 Nepalese general election, he won the election from Tanahun 2 (constituency).
