= Arunodaya =

Arunodaya अरुणोदय
- Village development committee
- Location in Nepal Arunodaya (Nepal)
- Coordinates: 27.97°N 84.01°E
- Country: Nepal
- Zone: Gandaki Zone
- District: Tanahu District

Population (2011)
  - Total: 5,008
- Time zone: UTC+5:45 (Nepal Time)

Arunodaya is a village development committee in Tanahu District in the Gandaki Zone of central Nepal. At the time of the 2011 Nepal census it had a population of 5008 people living in 1098 individual households.
