= Manpang =

Manpang मनपाङ
- Village development committee
- Location in Nepal Manpang (Nepal)
- Coordinates: 28.03°N 84.17°E
- Country: Nepal
- Zone: Gandaki Zone
- District: Tanahu District

Population (1991)
  - Total: 6,962
- Time zone: UTC+5:45 (Nepal Time)

Manpang is a village development committee in Tanahu District in the Gandaki Zone of central Nepal. At the time of the 1991 Nepal census it had a population of 6962 people living in 1302 individual households.
