= Shreeram Neupane =

Nepalese Politician

- श्रीराम न्यौपाने

Member of Parliament, Pratinidhi Sabha
- Elected
- Assumed office 27 March 2026
- Preceded by: Shankar Bhandari
- Constituency: Tanahun 2

Personal details
- Citizenship: Nepalese
- Party: Rastriya Swatantra Party
- Profession: Politician

Shreeram Neupane (Note: Nepali: श्रीराम न्यौपाने) is a Nepalese politician serving as a member of parliament from the Rastriya Swatantra Party. He is the member of the 3rd Federal Parliament of Nepal elected from Tanahun 2 constituency in 2026 Nepalese General Election securing 32,687 votes and defeating Shankar Bhandari of the Nepali Congress. He was the coordinator of the election mobilization committee in the by-election of Tanahun-1. He is also a chief of party’s Central Department of Energy and Water Resources.
