= Kahu Shivapur =

Kahun Shivapur काहुँ शिवपुर रिसिङ्ग गाउँपालिका २
- Village development committee
- Location in Nepal Kahun Shivapur (Nepal)
- Coordinates: 27.92°N 84.26°E
- Country: Nepal
- Zone: Gandaki Zone
- District: Tanahun District

Population (1991)
  - Total: 6,162
- Time zone: UTC+5:45 (Nepal Time)

Kahun Shivapur is a [Rishing Rural Municipality 1&2 (Nepal)Rishing Rural Municipality in Tanahun District in the Gandaki Zone of central Nepal. At the time of the 1991 Nepal census it had a population of 6162 people living in 927 individual households.
