= Jaya Raj Acharya =

Nepali ambassador

Professor Jaya Raj Acharya (or Jayaraj Acharya) is a former ambassador of Nepal to the United Nations from 1991 to 1994, a scholar, author and lecturer at Tribhuvan University. He is a prominent foreign policy expert especially in Nepal's relations with India and China. He's raised awareness of Nepal's education, state of Nepali politics etc. in international forums. He's done numerous TV appearances in the Nepali Media. During his tenure at the United Nations, Acharya was the chairperson of the UN's anti-apartheid committee.

== Personal life ==
Acharya was born in 1951 in Bhanu VDC of Tanahun District to poet Naranath Acharya and his wife Ganga. He completed his Ph.D. from Georgetown University as a Fulbright Scholar. He was a fellow at Harvard University as well.

== Publications ==
- Acharya, Jaya Raj. "USA and South Asia: Before and After 9/11, 2001'." Institute of Foreign Affairs Policy Studies Series 4 (2004).
- Acharya, Jayaraj. "Nepalma Prajatantra Ra Nepali Congress." (1979): 71.
- Acharya, Jayaraj. A Descriptive Grammar of Nepali and an Analyzed Corpus. Washington, D.C: Georgetown University Press, 1991. Print.
- Acharya, Jayaraj. The Nepāla-Māhātmya of the Skandapurāṇa: Legends on the Sacred Places and Deities of Nepal. Jaipur: Nirala Publications, 1992. Print.
- Acharya, Jayaraj. Traditional Grammars, English and Nepali: A Study : the Influence of J.c. Nesfield's Idiom, Grammar, and Synthesis on Somanath Sharma's Madhyachandrika, a Middle Nepali Grammar. Kathmandu, Nepal: Jayaraj Acharya, 1980. Print.
- Acharya, Jayaraj, Veerendrakesari Arjyal, and Veerendrakesari Arjyal. Traditional Grammars, English and Nepali: A Study. Kathmandu: J. Acharya, 1980. Print.
- Bhānubhakta, and Jayaraj Acharya. Bhanubhakta Acharya: His Life and Selected Poems. Kathmandu: Vidyarthi Pustak Bhandar, 2011. Print.
- Acharya, Jayaraj. Nepal's Foreign Policy: A Reflection = Nepālako Pararāshṭra Nīti : Eka Vimarśa, 2014. Print.
- Ācārya, Naranātha, Śivarāja Ācārya, Sāmbarāja Ācārya, and Jayaraj Acharya. Ādikavi Bhānubhakta Ācāryako Saccā Jı̄vanacarittra. Tanuṅa: Naranātha Ācārya, 1979. Print.
- Acharya, Jayaraj. Yadunātha Khanāla: Jīvanī Ra Vicāra. Lalitpur: Sājhā Prakāśana, 2003. Print.
- Koirālā, Viśveśvara P, Jayaraj Acharya, Viśveśvara P. Koirālā, and Viśveśvara P. Koirālā. Modiāina, 2012. Print.
- Acharya, Jayaraj. A Glossary of Business Administration and Public Administration. Kathmandu, Nepal: Institute of Management, Tribhuvan University, 1980. Print.
