= Deurali, Tanahu =

Coordinates: 27°53′N 84°28′E

Deurali, Tanahu देउराली
- Village development committee
- Location in Nepal Deurali, Tanahu (Nepal)
- Country: Nepal
- Zone: Gandaki Zone
- District: Tanahu District

Population (1991)
  - Total: 2,910
- Time zone: UTC+5:45 (Nepal Time)

Deurali, Tanahu is a village development committee in Tanahu District in the Gandaki Zone of central Nepal. At the time of the 1991 Nepal census it had a population of 2910 people living in 44 individual households.
