= Chhimkeshwari =

Coordinates: 27°51′N 84°29′E

Chhimkeshwari छिम्केश्वरी
- Village development committee
- Location in Nepal Chhimkeshwari (Nepal)
- Country: Nepal
- Zone: Gandaki Zone
- District: Tanahu District

Population (2011)
  - Total: 1,887
- Time zone: UTC+5:45 (Nepal Time)

Chhimkeshwari is a village development committee in Tanahu District in the Gandaki Zone of central Nepal. At the time of the 2011 Nepal census it had a population of 1887 people living in 356 individual households.
