= Thaprek, Tanahun =

Thaprek, Gandaki थप्रेक
- Village development committee
- Location in Nepal Thaprek, Gandaki (Nepal)
- Coordinates: 28.09°N 84.15°E
- Country: Nepal
- Zone: Gandaki Zone
- District: Tanahu District

Population (1991)
  - Total: 3,844
- Time zone: UTC+5:45 (Nepal Time)

Thaprek is a village development committee in Tanahu District in the Gandaki Zone of central Nepal. At the time of the 1991 Nepal census it had a population of 3844 people living in 752 individual households.
