= Majhakot, Tanahun =

Majhakot, Gandaki माझकोट
- Village development committee
- Location in Nepal Majhakot, Gandaki (Nepal)
- Coordinates: 27.95°N 84.06°E
- Country: Nepal
- Zone: Gandaki Zone
- District: Tanahu District

Population (1991)
  - Total: 6,018
- Time zone: UTC+5:45 (Nepal Time)

Majhakot, Gandaki is a village development committee in Tanahu District in the Gandaki Zone of central Nepal. At the time of the 1991 Nepal census it had a population of 6018 people living in 995 individual households.
