= Barbhanjyang =

Barbhanjyang बरभञ्ज्याङ
- Village development committee
- Location in Nepal Barbhanjyang (Nepal)
- Coordinates: 28.01°N 84.38°E
- Country: Nepal
- Zone: Gandaki Zone
- District: Tanahu District

Population (2011)
  - Total: 5,074
- Time zone: UTC+5:45 (Nepal Time)

Barbhanjyang is a village development committee in Tanahu District in the Gandaki Zone of central Nepal. At the time of the 2011 Nepal census it had a population of 5074 people living in 1365 individual households.
