= Kabilas, Tanahun =

Kabilas कबिलास
- Village Development Committee
- Country: Nepal
- Zone: Gandaki Zone
- District: Tanahu District

Population (1991)
  - Total: 4,138
- Time zone: UTC+5:45 (Nepal Time)

Kabilas is a Village Development Committee in Tanahu District in the Gandaki Zone of central Nepal. At the time of the 1991 Nepal census, it had a population of 4,138 residing in 782 individual households.
