= Chhang, Nepal =

Chhang, Nepal छाङ
- Village development committee
- Location in Nepal Chhang, Nepal (Nepal)
- Coordinates: 27.99°N 84.13°E
- Country: Nepal
- Zone: Gandaki Zone
- District: Tanahu District

Population (2011)
  - Total: 5,966
- Time zone: UTC+5:45 (Nepal Time)

Chhang is a village development committee in Tanahu District in the Gandaki Zone of central Nepal. At the time of the 2011 Nepal census it had a population of 5966 people living in 1499 individual households.
