= Dhodeni =

Dhodeni ढोडेनी
- Village development committee
- Location in Nepal Dhodeni (Nepal)
- Coordinates: 28.30°N 84.58°E
- Country: Nepal
- Zone: Gandaki Province
- District: Lamjung District

Population (1991)
  - Total: 2,001
- Time zone: UTC+5:45 (Nepal Time)

Dhodeni is a village development committee in Lamjung District in the Gandaki Province of northern-central Nepal. At the time of the 1991 Nepal census it had a population of 2001 people living in 368 individual households.
