= Thaprek, Nuwakot =

Thaprek थप्रेक
- Village Development Committee
- Interactive map of Thaprek
- Coordinates: 27°55′N 85°20′E
- Country: Nepal
- Zone: Bagmati Zone
- District: Nuwakot District

Population (1991)
  - Total: 3,585
- Time zone: UTC+5:45 (Nepal Time)

Thaprek is a Village Development Committee in Nuwakot District in the Bagmati Zone of central Nepal. At the time of the 1991 Nepal census it had a population of 3585 people residing in 632 individual households.

== Notable people ==
- Ram Kumar Tiwari
- Sita Khadka
- Prakash Pandit
- Nani Kaji Tiwari
