= Devghat =

Hindu Pilgrimage Site in Nepal

Devghat, Nepal देवघाट
- former Village development committee
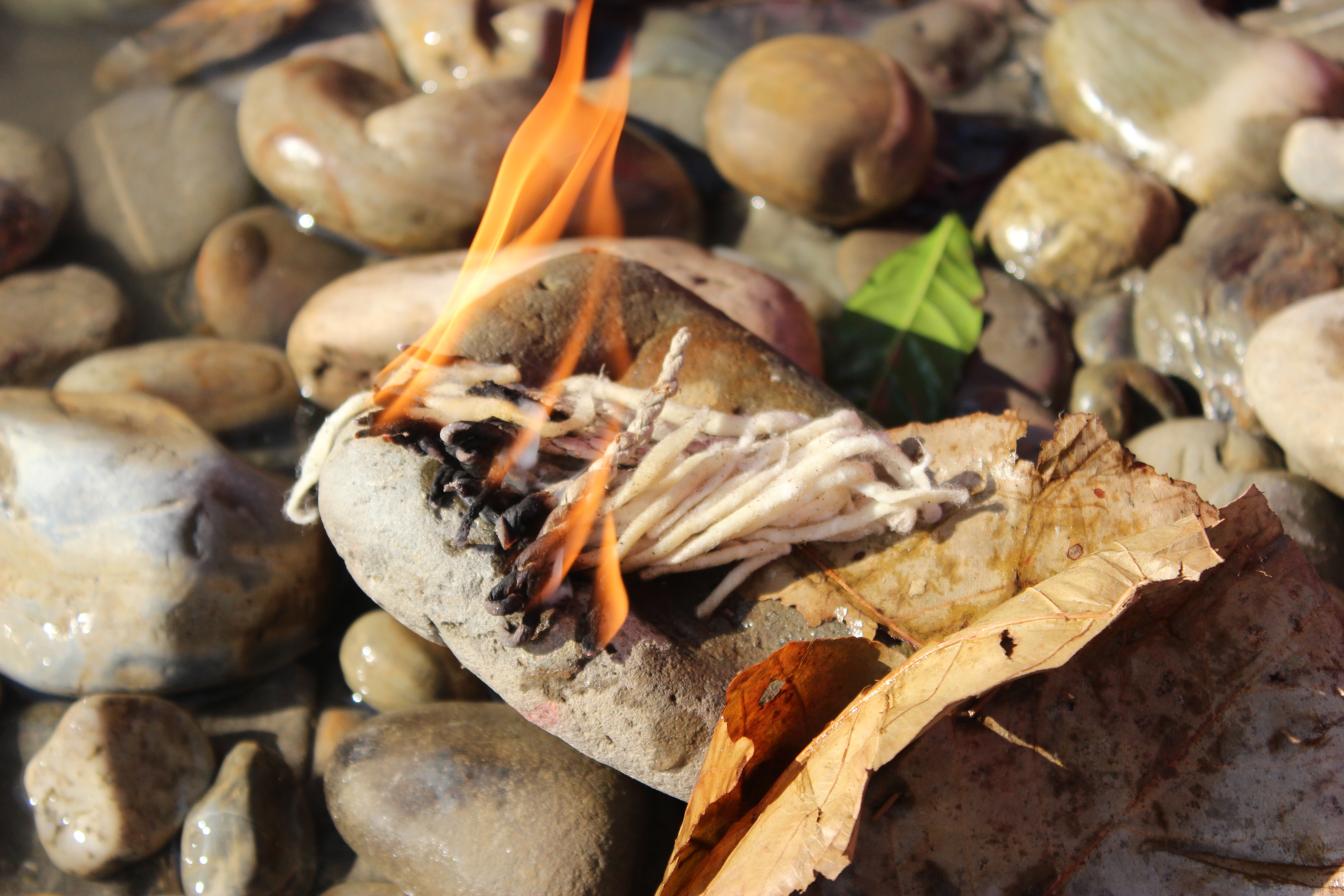

- Location in Nepal Devghat, Nepal (Nepal)
- Coordinates: 27.80°N 84.41°E
- Country: Nepal
- Zone: Gandaki Zone
- District: Tanahu District

Population (1991)
  - Total: 5,786
- Time zone: UTC+5:45 (Nepal Time)
- Website: http://devghatmun.gov.np/

Devghat (Sanskrit: देवघाटम्, Devaghāṭam Sanskrit pronunciation: [deːʋɐˈɡʱaːʈɐm]) is a religious and cultural center in central Nepal. At the time of the 1991 Nepal census it had a population of 5,786 people living in 1,132 individual households.
