= Chhipchhipe =

Village development committee in Gandaki Zone, Nepal

Chhipchhipe छिपछिपे
- Village development committee
- Location in Nepal Chhipchhipe (Nepal)
- Coordinates: 27.85°N 84.37°E
- Country: Nepal
- Zone: Gandaki Zone
- District: Tanahu District

Population (1991)
  - Total: 2,398
- Time zone: UTC+5:45 (Nepal Time)

Chhipchhipe is a village development committee in Tanahu District in the Gandaki Zone of central Nepal. At the time of the 1991 Nepal census it had a population of 2398 people living in 322 individual households.
