= Bhujel language =

Chepangic language spoken in Nepal

Bhujel
- Bujhyal
- Region: Nepal (Tanahu District); Sikkim
- Native speakers: 22,000 (2011 census)
- Language family: Sino-Tibetan: Chepangic Greater-Magaric Branch; Bhujel
- Writing system: Devanagari; Kharpa

Official status
- Official language in: India: Sikkim

Language codes
- ISO 639-3: byh
- Glottolog: bujh1238

Bhujel, also called Bujhyal, is a Chepangic language of Greater Magaric Branch spoken in central Nepal and Sikkim in India. It is a semi-tonal language, employing a complex array of affixes. Bhujel is a Tibeto-Burman language. Bhujel was granted additional official status in Sikkim in 2022.

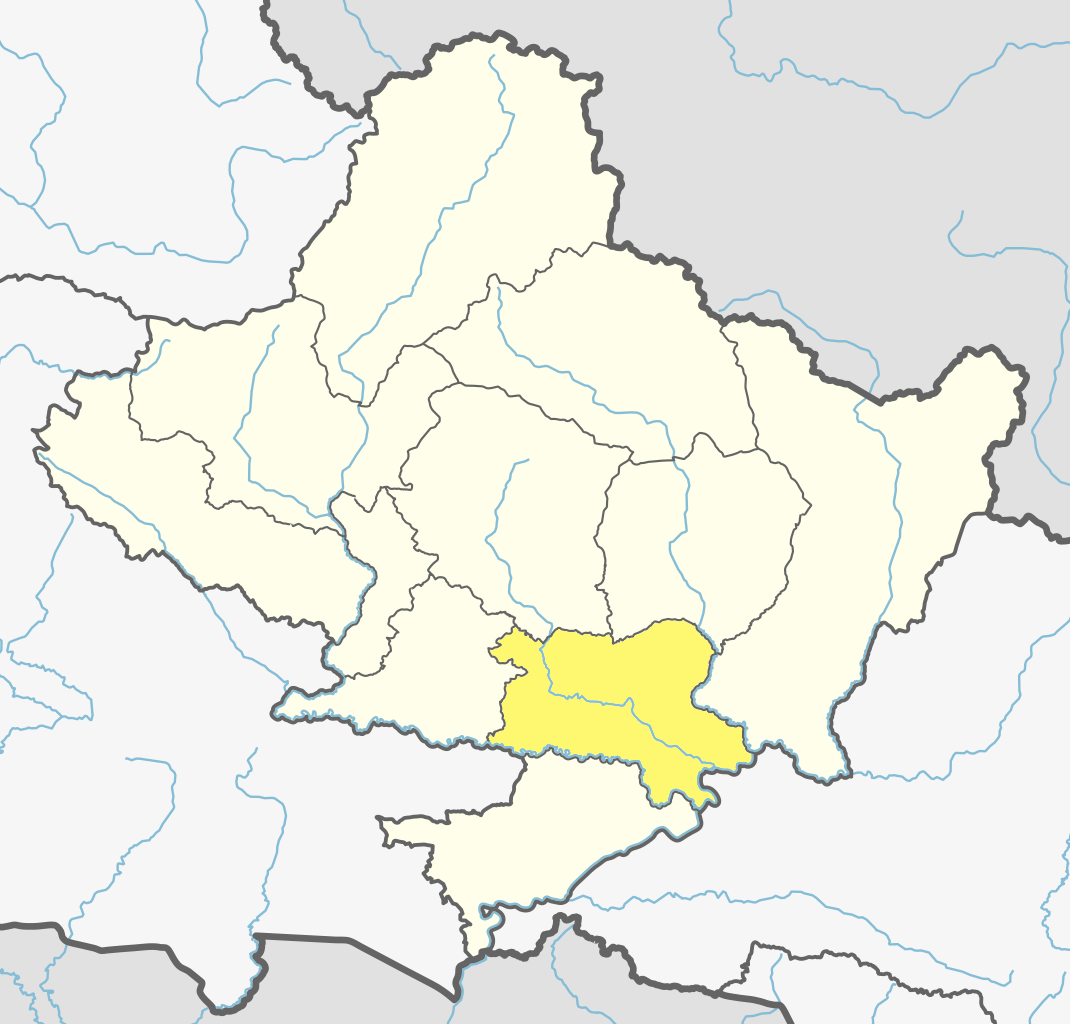
Map of the Tanahu District, the only Bhujel language is widely used in Nepal.

== Geographical distribution ==
Bhujel is spoken in the following villages of Nepal (Ethnologue).

- Tanahun District, Gandaki Zone: Kulmun, Arthumpka, Andimul, and Baniyatar
- Gorkha District, Gandaki Zone: Beltar
- Nawalparasi District, Lumbini Zone: Dhodeni
- Chitwan District, Narayani Zone: Chanaute

== Dialects ==
Ethnologue lists the following dialects of Bhujel.

- Kulmun
- Arthumpka
- Andimul
- Baniyatar
- Beltar
- Dhodeni
- Chanaute
