= Kota, Tanahun =

Kota कोटा
- Village development committee
- Location in Nepal Kota (Nepal)
- Coordinates: 27.79°N 84.35°E
- Country: Nepal
- Zone: Gandaki Zone
- District: Tanahu District

Population (1991)
  - Total: 3,428
- Time zone: UTC+5:45 (Nepal Time)

Kota is a village development committee in Tanahu District in the Gandaki Zone of central Nepal. At the time of the 1991 Nepal census it had a population of 3428 people living in 532 individual households.
