= Satiswara =

Satiswara सतिश्वरा
- Village development committee
- Location in Nepal Satiswara (Nepal)
- Coordinates: 28.07°N 84.33°E
- Country: Nepal
- Zone: Gandaki Zone
- District: Tanahu District

Population (1991)
  - Total: 5,524
- Time zone: UTC+5:45 (Nepal Time)

Satiswara is a village development committee in Tanahu District in the Gandaki Zone of central Nepal. At the time of the 1991 Nepal census it had a population of 5524 people living in 1162 individual households.
