= Chok Chisapani =

Chok Chisapani चोक चिसापानी
- Village development committee
- Location in Nepal Chok Chisapani (Nepal)
- Coordinates: 28.10°N 84.42°E
- Country: Nepal
- Zone: Gandaki Zone
- District: Tanahu District

Population (1991)
  - Total: 4,614
- Time zone: UTC+5:45 (Nepal Time)

Chok Chisapani is a village development committee in Tanahu District in the Gandaki Zone of central Nepal. At the time of the 1991 Nepal census, it had a population of 4614 people living in 462 individual households.
