= Tanahunsur =

Tanahunsur तनहुँसुर
- Village development committee
- Location in Nepal Tanahunsur (Nepal)
- Coordinates: 28.04°N 84.33°E
- Country: Nepal
- Zone: Gandaki Zone
- District: Tanahu District

Government
  - CA member: Shankar Bhandari

Population (1991)
  - Total: 2,955
- Time zone: UTC+5:45 (Nepal Time)
- Postal code: 00977
- Area code: 065

Tanahunsur is a village development committee in Tanahu District in the Gandaki Zone of central Nepal. At the time of the 1991 Nepal census it had a population of 2955 people living in 615 individual households.

There are two peaks at the top of Tanahunsur. We can still observe approximately 200 years old Sen dynasty's old palace area, temples, three canon which is believed to be the birthplace of Prithvi Naryan Shaha's mother.
