= Rupakot, Kaski =

Coordinates: 28°9′N 84°8′E

Rupakot, Gandaki रूपाकोट
- Village Development Committee
- Location in Nepal Rupakot, Gandaki (Nepal)
- Country: Nepal
- Zone: Gandaki Zone
- District: Kaski District

Population (1991)
  - Total: 3,785
- Time zone: UTC+5:45 (Nepal Time)
- Postal code: 33701
- Area code: 01

Rupakot is a town and Village Development Committee in Kaski District in the Gandaki Zone of northern-central Nepal. At the time of the 1991 Nepal census it had a population of 3,785 persons residing in 789 individual households.
