= Purkot =

Purkot पुर्कोट
- Village development committee
- Nickname: पुर्कोट
- Location in Nepal Purkot (Nepal)
- Coordinates: 28.07°N 84.46°E
- Country: Nepal
- Zone: Gandaki Zone
- District: Tanahu District

Population (1991)
  - Total: 7,256
- Time zone: UTC+5:45 (Nepal Time)
- Area code: 065
- Website: www.sandukmedia.com

Purkot is a village development committee in Tanahu District in the Gandaki Zone of central Nepal. At the time of the 2011 Nepal census it had a population of 7,188 people, 3,044 male and 4,144 female. This VDC is located on the highway called Chame highway (Dumre-Besishahar) and has a small town called Baisjanger. The Marshyandi river flows through this place.

There are a few holy places like Marshyangdi beni ghat sataal and the Temples of the Five Hindu gods (Pancha Mandir) of Shiva, Bishnu, Krishna, Surya and Krishna, located beside the Marsyangdi River at Baisjangar Tanahun.
