= Risti, Nepal =

Risti रिस्ती
- Village development committee
- Location in Nepal Risti (Nepal)
- Coordinates: 28.10°N 84.31°E
- Country: Nepal
- Zone: Gandaki Zone
- District: Tanahu District

Population (1991)
  - Total: 2,560
- Time zone: UTC+5:45 (Nepal Time)

Risti is a village development committee in Tanahu District in the Gandaki Zone of central Nepal. At the time of the 1991 Nepal census it had a population of 2560.
