= Baidi, Nepal =

Baidi, Nepal बैदी
- Village development committee
- Location in Nepal Baidi, Nepal (Nepal)
- Coordinates: 27.86°N 84.32°E
- Country: Nepal
- Zone: Gandaki Zone
- District: Tanahu District

Population (2011)
  - Total: 4,551
- Time zone: UTC+5:45 (Nepal Time)

Baidi, Nepal is a village development committee in Tanahu District in the Gandaki Zone of central Nepal. At the time of the 2011 Nepal census it had a population of 4551 people living in 844 individual households.
