= Kumhali language =

Indo-Aryan language of Nepal

Kumal
- Native to: Nepal
- Ethnicity: Kumal
- Native speakers: 12,000 (2011 census)
- Language family: Indo-European: Indo-Iranian; Indo-Aryan; Eastern; Bihari; (unclassified); Kumal

Language codes
- ISO 639-3: kra
- Glottolog: kumh1238
- ELP: Kumhali
- Coordinates: 27.83°N 84.14°E

Kumhali,(कुमाल भाषा, कुमाले कुरा) Kumali, or Kumbale, is an Indo-Aryan language spoken by some of the Kumal people of Nepal. It has 12,000 speakers, out of an ethnic population of 121,000.
