= Bhujel =

Indigenous group, Caste group in Nepal

Bhujel people
Total population
- 120,245 (2021 census)

Regions with significant populations
- Nepal, India, Bhutan

Languages
- Bhujel

Religion
- Hinduism 97.6%, Christianity 2%, Others

Related ethnic groups
- Chepang people, Tibetan and other Tibeto-Burman ethnic groups, Mongols

Bhujel are a Tibeto-Burman ethnic group now living in Nepal, India, and Bhutan. They are scattered in several districts, mostly in Tanahu and Syangja. The inhabitants living near the Bhuji Khola river called Bhujel. Bhujel are divided into four subcastes – Bhujyal, Gharti, Nisel and Khawas.

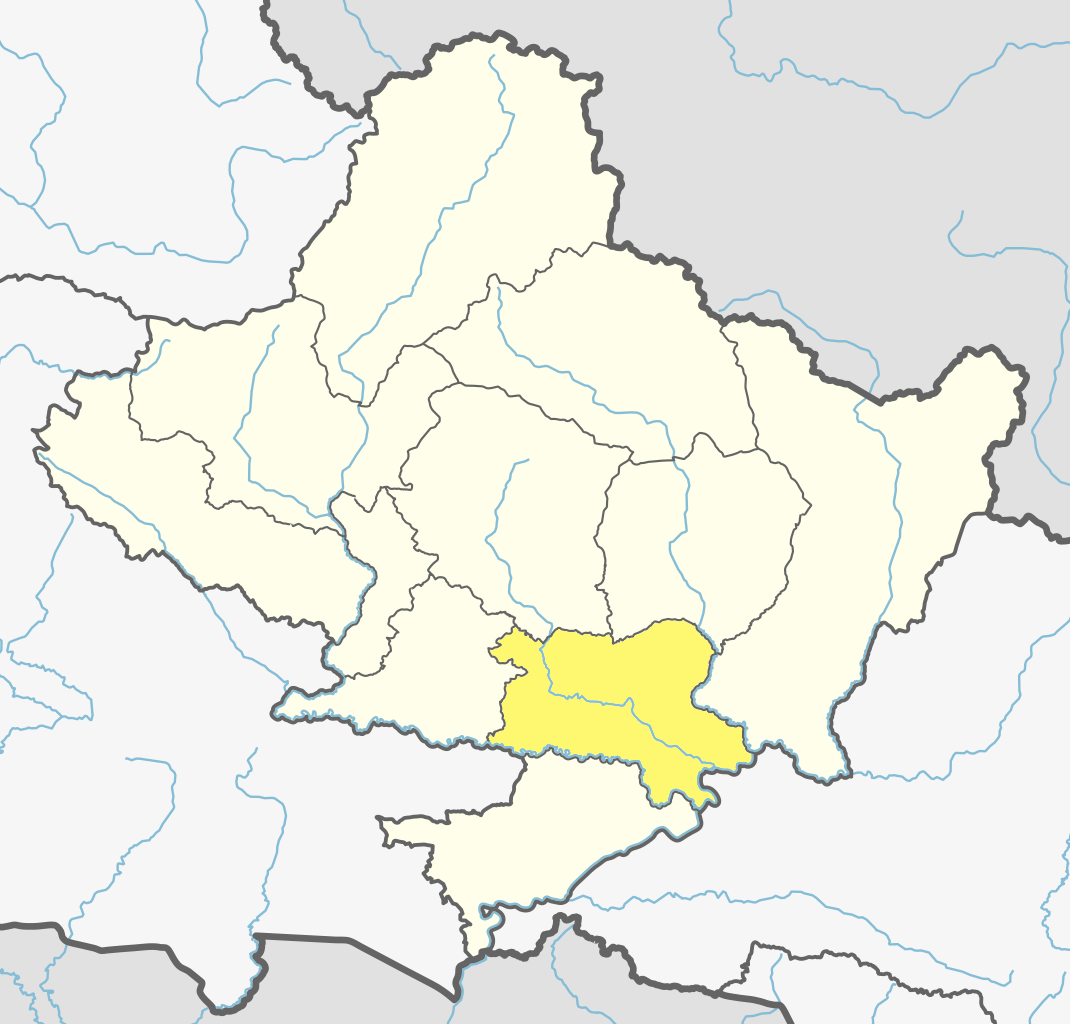
Map of the Tanahu District, the home of Bhujel people.

== Culture ==
In the Bhujel speech community, Bhimsen, a god, is worshiped in the month of October on the eve of harvesting the crops. They build the shrine inside or outside the house. They offer and sacrifice of a couple of cocks. On this occasion, Ghatunach is performed with the help and guidance of guruma (the female teacher). On this occasion, the guruma and the dancers are highly honoured. They are also worshipped as goddesses. They enjoy very high status in Chandi. Chandi is one of the very popular local festivals.

== Demographics ==
The Central Bureau of Statistics of Nepal classifies the Bhujel (called Gharti/Bhujel in the Nepal census) as a subgroup within the broader social group of Mountain/Hill Janajati. At the time of the 2011 Nepal census, 118,650 people (0.4% of the population of Nepal) were Bhujel. The frequency of Bhujel people by province was as follows:

- Gandaki Province (1.3%)
- Koshi Province (0.8%)
- Bagmati Province (0.6%)
- Lumbini Province (0.2%)
- Madhesh Province (0.1%)
- Karnali Province (0.0%)
- Sudurpashchim Province (0.0%)

The frequency of Bhujel people was higher than national average (0.4%) in the following districts:

- Tanahun (2.5%)
- Syangja (2.4%)
- Lamjung (2.3%)
- Okhaldhunga (2.1%)
- Solukhumbu (1.9%)
- Bhojpur (1.7%)
- Khotang (1.7%)
- Ramechhap (1.6%)
- Dolakha (1.5%)
- Sindhuli (1.5%)
- Kaski (1.4%)
- Tehrathum (1.3%)
- Dhankuta (1.2%)
- Dhading (1.0%)
- Gulmi (1.0%)
- Arghakhanchi (0.9%)
- Jhapa (0.9%)
- Kavrepalanchok (0.9%)
- Sindhupalchowk (0.9%)
- Udayapur (0.9%)
- Chitwan (0.8%)
- Gorkha (0.8%)
- Ilam (0.7%)
- Palpa (0.6%)
- Sunsari (0.6%)
- Nuwakot (0.5%)
- Parbat (0.5%)
- Pyuthan (0.5%)
- Sankhuwasabha (0.5%)
