= Tanahun District =

Coordinates: 27°55′N 84°15′E

Tanahun District तनहुँ
- District
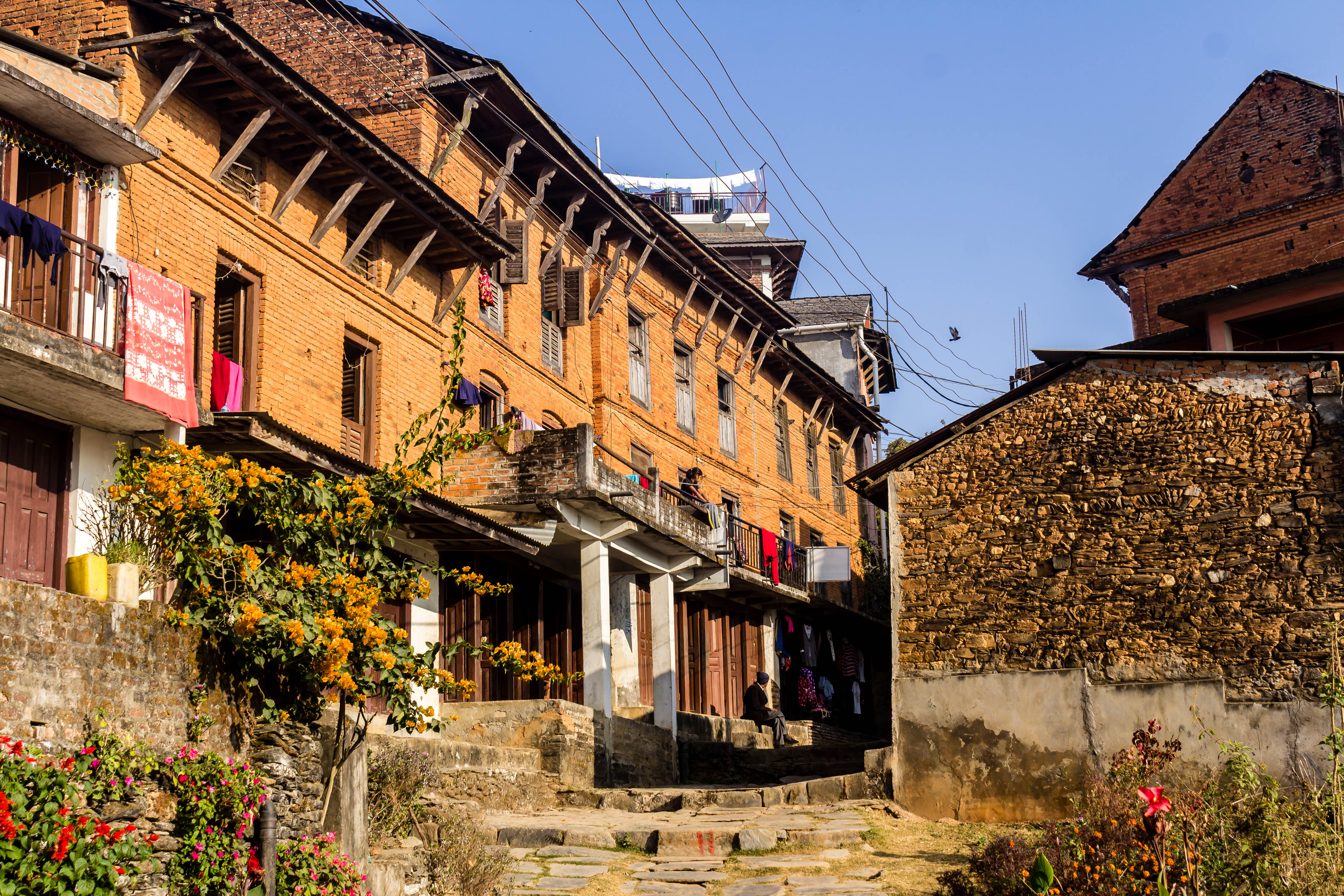
- Bandipur
- Interactive map of Tanahun District
- Country: Nepal
- Province: Gandaki Province
- Established: 1872
- Admin HQ.: Damauli (part of Byas Municipality)

Government
  - Type: Coordination committee
  - Body: DCC, Tanahun

Area
  - Total: 1,546 km^{2} (597 sq mi)

Population (2011)
  - Total: 323,288
  - Density: 209.1/km^{2} (541.6/sq mi)
- Time zone: UTC+05:45 (NPT)
- Telephone Code: 065
- Website: ddctanahu.gov.np

Tanahun District (Nepali: तनहुँ जिल्ला pronounced [tʌ.nʌ.ũ], or [tʌnʌɦũ]), a part of Gandaki Province, is one of the seventy-seven districts of Nepal. The district lies in central Nepal, with Damauli as its district headquarters. It covers an area of 1,546 km^{2} (597 sq mi) and has a population (2011) of 323,288. Previously the town of Bandipur was its district headquarter. The postal code of Tanahun is 33900.

Bhanubhakta Acharya (Nepali: भानुभक्त आचार्य; 1814–1868), a Nepalese poet and writer who translated the great epic Ramayana from Sanskrit to Khas language, was born to a Brahmin family in Chundi Ramgha in Tanahun on 29 Ashar, 1871 B.S. He received education with a strong leaning towards religion from his grandfather at home. He is honored with the title Adikabi for the contributions he has made in the field of poetry and Khas literature, and every year his birthday (29th of Ashad) is celebrated as a festival of Bhanujayanti by conducting various programs, usually academics and poem recitation.

Chimkeswori is the highest hill of Tanahun.

== People from Tanahun District ==
- Bhanubhakta Acharya, Poet.
- Rajendra Chhetri, Military officer.
- Ram Chandra Poudel, 3rd President of Nepal.
- Jaya Raj Acharya, Diplomat.
- Nara Nath Acharya, Kaviraj (Ayurvedic Physician), writer, poet.
- Kshetra Pratap Adhikary, Poet, lyricist.
- Rajendra Bahadur Bhandari, A Nepalese long-distance runner and soldier.
- Ghansi
- Gokul Joshi, A Nepali poet and a progressive songwriter.
- Govinda Raj Joshi, politician.
- Rewati Raman Khanal, Law scholar and writer.
- Sardar Yadunath Khanal, Diplomat.
- Prem Raja Mahat, Singer and songwriter.
- Anju Panta, Singer.
- Garima Panta, Actress and Model.
- Gopal Parajuli, 27th chief Justice of Nepal.
- Sanish Shrestha, Footballer.
- Bhekh Bahadur Thapa, Diplomat and Fourth Governor of Nepal Rastra Bank.
- Sher Bahadur Thapa, Military officer.
- Narayan Wagle, Journalist and Writer.

== Coordinates and location type ==
- Latitude: 27.91667
- Longitude:84.25
- Latitude (DMS):27° 55' 0 N
- Longitude (DMS):84° 15' 0 E

== Geography and climate ==
Climate Zone	Elevation Range	% of Area
Lower Tropical	below 300 meters (1,000 ft)	2.3%
Upper Tropical	300 to 1,000 meters 1,000 to 3,300 ft.	88.0%
Subtropical	1,000 to 2,000 meters 3,300 to 6,600 ft.	8.8%

== Major religious spots ==
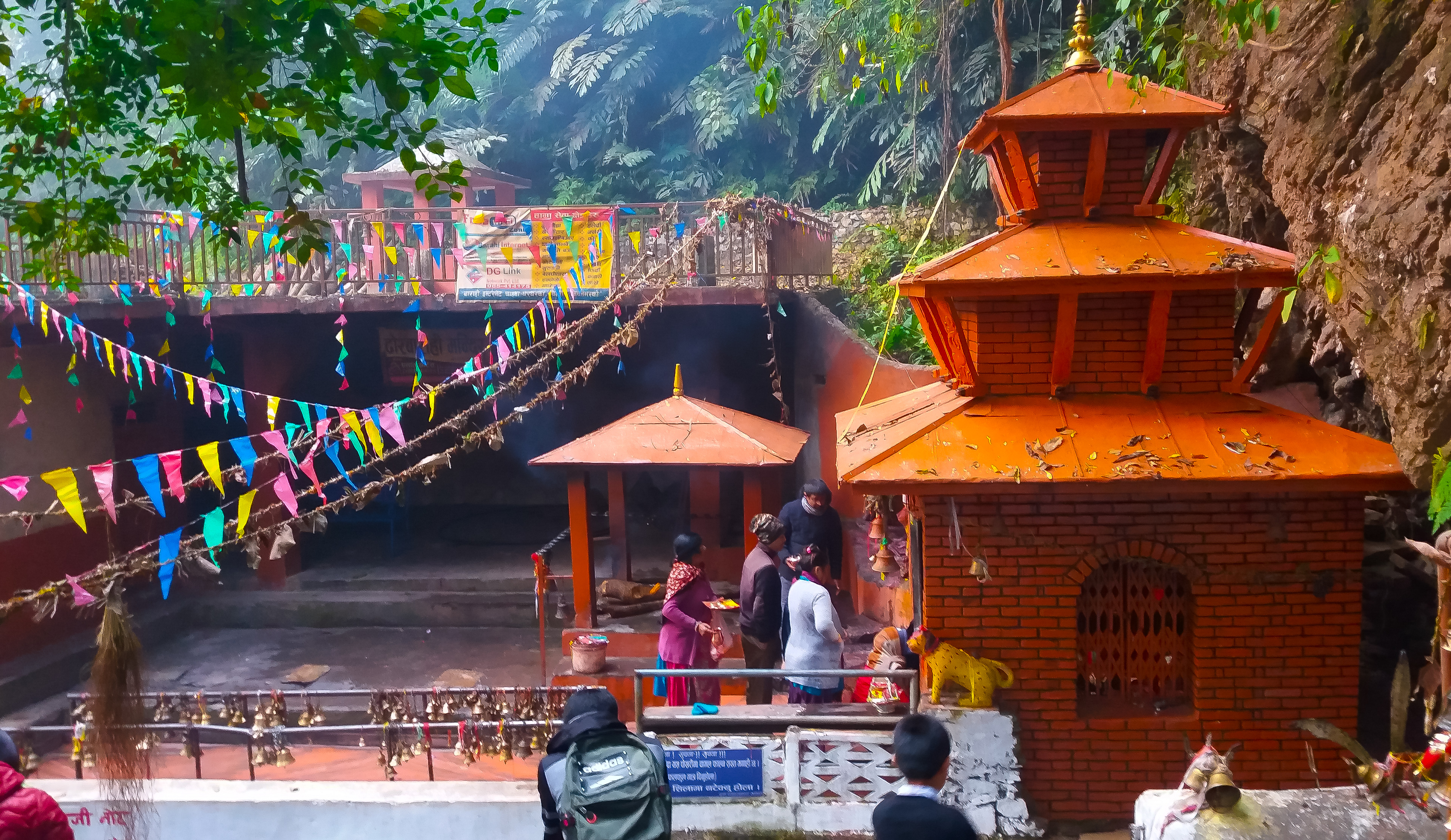
Picture of Dhorbarahi Temple, one of the most popular temple of Tanahun District.

- Vyash gufa, Damauli
- Pancha mandir, Damauli
- Thanithan, Basantapur
- Teen Khole Devi Mandir, Khairenitar-8 Jamdi
- Chabdi barahi, Chabdi
- Nirjala Mai, Turture
- Akala Mai, aanboo khaireni Rural Municipality
- Akala Mai Magde Rural Municipality
- Aadhi Mul
- Dhorbarahi, Dhorphirdi
- Khadga Devi Mandir, Bandipur
- Devghat Tirtha isatal
- Chhimkeshwori Mai Mandir, Anbu Khaireni Rural Municipality
- Tanahun Kalika, Damauli
- Mahadev Than, Vyas - 9
- Siddha Gufa/Cave, (Biggest Cave of South Asia) Bimalnagar, Dumre, Bandipur Rural Municipality

Kalika Sthan Byas 8

== Demographics ==
Historical population
Census year	Pop.	±% p.a.
1981	223,438	—
1991	268,073	+1.84%
2001	315,237	+1.63%
2011	323,288	+0.25%
2021	327,620	+0.13%
Source: Citypopulation

At the time of the 2021 Nepal census, Tanahun District had a population of 321,153. 6.82% of the population is under 5 years of age. It has a literacy rate of 81.60% and a sex ratio of 1140 females per 1000 males. 206,601 (64.33%) lived in municipalities.

Castes/ethnic groups in Tanahun district (2021)
1. Magar (26.0%)
2. Chhetri (11.5%)
3. Bahun (11.4%)
4. Gurung (11.0%)
5. Kami (8.20%)
6. Newar (7.64%)
7. Sarki (4.92%)
8. Damai (3.69%)
9. Kumal (2.72%)
10. Thakuri (2.39%)
11. Bhujel (2.36%)
12. Other Hill Janjati (4.92%)
13. Others (3.28%)

Hill Janjatis are the largest group (47% of the population) of which Magars are the largest group. Khas people are the second largest, of which Dalits are 17% of the population. 8% are Newar and 1% are Muslim.

Languages of Tanahun district (2021)
1. Nepali (62.7%)
2. Magar (19.7%)
3. Gurung (8.13%)
4. Nepal Bhasha (3.54%)
5. Darai (1.10%)
6. Others (4.83%)

At the time of the 2021 census, 62.71% of the population spoke Nepali, 19.69% Magar, 8.13% Gurung, 3.54% Nepal Bhasha and 1.10% Darai as their first language. In 2011, 61.7% of the population spoke Nepali as their first language.

Religion in Tanahun District (2021)
Religion	Percent
Hinduism	84.08%
Buddhism	9.73%
Christianity	2.30%
Bon	1.82%
Islam	1.56%
Prakriti	0.46%
Other or not stated	0.05%

== Administration ==
The district consists of 10 Municipalities, out of which four are urban municipality and six are rural municipalities. These are as follows:

- Bhanu Municipality
- Bhimad Municipality
- Byas Municipality
- Shuklagandaki Municipality
- Anbu Khaireni Rural Municipality
- Devghat Rural Municipality
- Bandipur Rural Municipality
- Rishing Rural Municipality
- Ghiring Rural Municipality
- Myagde Rural Municipality

=== Former village development committees ===
Prior to the restructuring of the district, Tanahun District consisted of the following municipalities and village development committees:

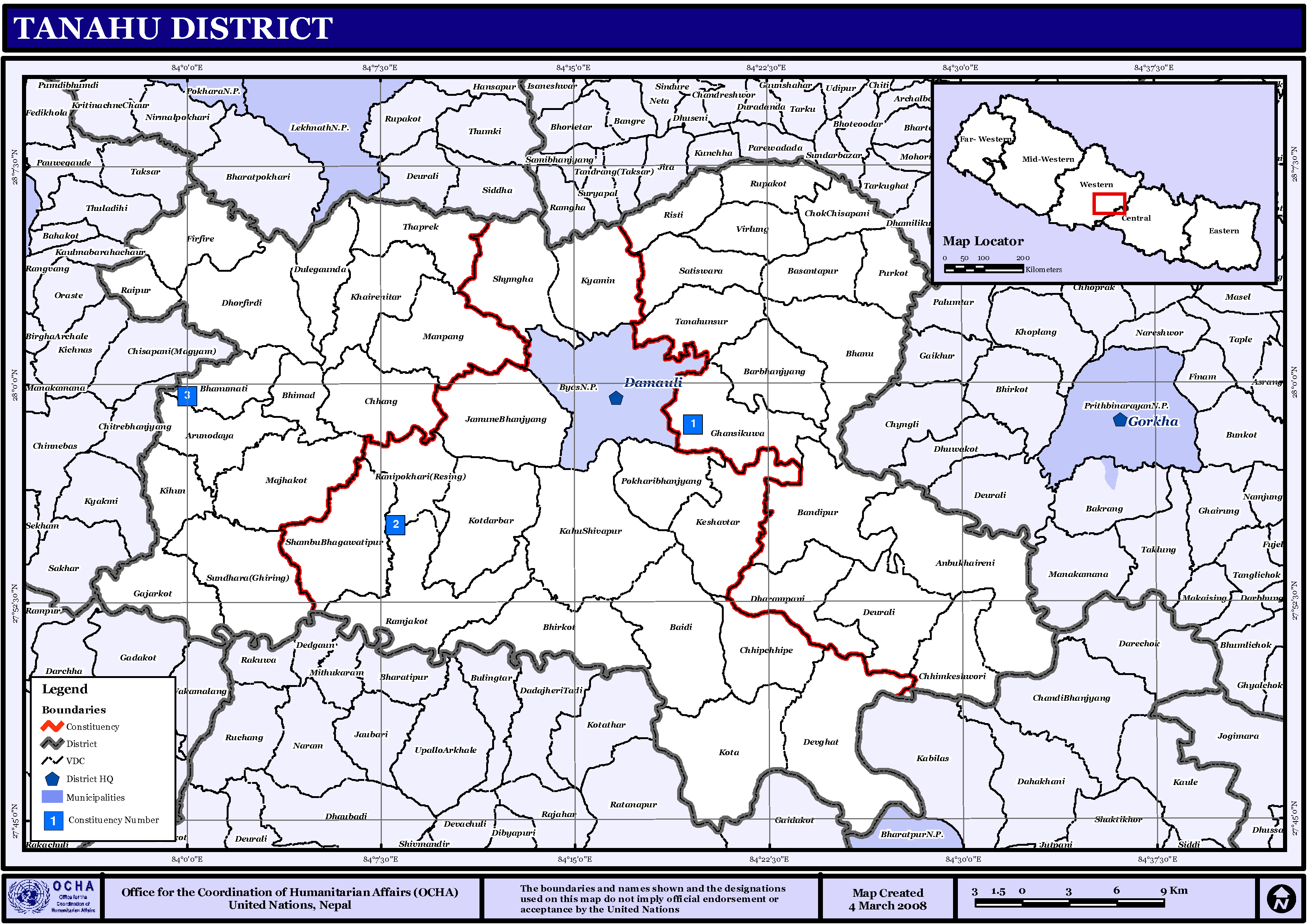
Map of the VDCs in Tanahu District

- Anbu Khaireni Municipality
- Arunodaya
- Baidi
- Bhanumati
- Bhirkot
- Bhirlung
- Chhang
- Chhimkeshwari
- Chhipchhipe
- Chok Chisapani
- Deurali
- Dharampani
- Gajarkot
- Ghansikuwa
- Jamune Bhanjyang
- Kabilas
- Kahu Shivapur
- Keshavtar
- Kihun
- Kota
- Kotdarbar
- Kyamin
- Majhakot
- Manpang
- Phirphire
- Purkot
- Raipur
- Ramjakot
- Ranipokhari
- Risti
- Rupakot
- Satiswara
- Sundhara
- Syamgha
- Tanahunsur
- Thaprek

== See also ==
- Western Region Campus
- Bhanubhakta Acharya
- Nara Nath Acharya
- Bandipur: The Queen of Hills of Nepal
