= Language movement =

Language movement or Language Movement may refer to:

== Language campaigns ==
- Plain Language Movement, a campaign to make writing easy to read, understand, and use
- Language revitalization, attempts by interested parties to reverse the decline of a language that is endangered, moribund, or extinct
- Linguistic purism, the practice of defining one variety of a language as being purer than other varieties
- Language secessionism, an attitude supporting the separation of a language variety from other forms of the language in order to make it a distinct language

== Language-specific social and political movements ==
- Afrikaans language movement, originating in late 19th century South Africa
- Andalusian language movement, a fringe movement promoting Andalusian as an independent language separate from Spanish, with attempts at standardizing Andalusian
- Baloch independence movement, a movement that claims the Baloch people, an ethno-linguistic group mainly found in Pakistan, Iran and Afghanistan, are a distinct nation
- Bengali language movement, a political movement in former East Pakistan (currently Bangladesh) advocating the recognition of the Bengali language as an official language of the then-Dominion of Pakistan
- Bengali language movement in India, a campaign to preserve Bengali language and Bengalis culture in India
  - Bengali Language Movement (Barak Valley)
  - Bengali Language Movement (Manbhum)
- English-only movement, a political movement to use English as the only language in official government operations in the United States of America
- Gaelic revival, the late-nineteenth-century national revival of interest in the Irish language and Irish Gaelic culture
  - Language Freedom Movement, an organization opposing the state-sponsored revival of the Irish language
- Illyrian movement, a pan-South-Slavist cultural and political campaign during the first half of the 19th century
- Kamtapur language movement, A linguistic campaign for Kamtapuri or Rajbanshi language in Jalpaiguri, Cooch Behar districts of West Bengal; Jharkhand and Bihar, India.
- Meitei language movement (also known as Manipuri language movement)
  - Meitei linguistic purism movement, an ongoing linguistic movement, aimed to attain linguistic purism in Meitei language
  - Scheduled language movement, a historical linguistic movement in Northeast India, aimed at the recognition of Meitei language as one of the official languages of the Indian Republic
  - Meitei classical language movement, an ongoing linguistic movement in Northeast India, aimed at the recognition of Meitei language as a "classical language"
  - Meitei associate official language movement, a semi active linguistic movement in Northeast India, aimed at the recognition of Meitei language as an "associate" official language of Assam
- Nepal Bhasa movement, a movement for linguistic rights of Nepal Bhasa speakers in Nepal
- Nepali language movement, a movement for linguistic rights of Nepali language speakers in India
- Norwegian language conflict, an ongoing controversy within Norwegian culture and politics related to spoken and written Norwegian
- Punjabi Language Movement, a linguistic movement in Punjab, Pakistan aimed at reviving Punjabi language, art, and culture
- Rajasthani language movement, a campaign for greater recognition for the Rajasthani language
- Reintegrationism, a linguistic and cultural movement in Galicia which views Galician and Portuguese as a single language
- Scandinavian movement, literary and political movements that support various degrees of cooperation among the Scandinavian or Nordic countries
- Urdu movement, a socio-political movement aimed at making Urdu the universal language and symbol of the cultural and political identity of the Muslim communities of the Indian subcontinent

== Linguistic theory ==
- Movement (sign language), the distinctive hand actions that form words in sign languages
- Syntactic movement, the means by which some theories of syntax address discontinuities
- Tough movement, theories about the movement of certain types of objects in formal syntax
- Wh-movement, a mechanism of syntax that helps express a question.

== See also ==
- Language Movement Day, a national day of Bangladesh to commemorate the Bengali Language Movement
