= Nepali language movement =

Movement for recognition of the Nepali language in India

Nepali Language Movement
- Part of Language conflict in India
- Bhāṣā hāmrō prāṇa hō (भाषा हाम्रो प्राण हो, trans. Language is our life), a slogan used during the movement.
- Location: Darjeeling, Kalimpong and Sikkim regions of India
- Goals: Recognition of Nepali language in the Indian constitution
- Result: Nepali language listed in the Eighth Schedule to the Constitution of India

Parties
| Government of India | Indian Gorkhas |

The Nepali Language Movement (Nepali: नेपाली भाषा आन्दोलन) was a political movement in the Republic of India advocating the recognition of the Nepali language as a language with official status in India. On 20 August 1992, the Lok Sabha passed a motion to add the Nepali language to the Eighth Schedule to the Constitution of India. According to an estimate in 2017, in India there about 40 million Nepali-language speaking Indians.

== Nepali Bhasa Manyata Diwas ==
Annually, Indian Gorkhas celebrate Nepali Language Recognition Day (officially Nepali Bhasha Manyata Diwas) on 20 August. The day is celebrated by organizing parades, literary and cultural programmes throughout India in places with significant Nepali speaking population. The same day is also celebrated as the Meitei Language Day (aka Manipuri language day) as both Nepali and Meitei language (officially called Manipuri language) get the "official language" status at the same time.

== Sister movements ==
During the same time, there was Meitei language movement. Both the Nepali and Meitei language movements get their goals on the same day, with the declaration of Nepali language and Meitei language (officially termed as "Manipuri language") as the official languages of India.

== Current movements ==
There is also an ongoing movement to create a Nepali-speaking Gorkhaland state in India.

== See also ==
- Gorkhaland Territorial Administration
