= Meitei associate official language movement =

Meitei language movement

Movement of Meitei language to be included as an associate official language of Assam
- "Meitei Lon" (literally meaning "Meitei language"), written in Meitei script
- English name: Movement of Meitei language to be included as an associate official language of Assam (Note: The word "associate" is used instead of "associated" in most sources. So, the title of this article about the event is also named using the word "associate".)
- Time: 2020 - 2021
- Duration: 2020 - 2021
- Venue: Northeast India (predominantly from Assam, Manipur and Tripura)
- Location: Northeast India (predominantly from Assam, Manipur and Tripura)
- Also known as: Associate official language movement of Meitei language; Associate official language movement of Manipuri language; Meitei associate official language movement; Manipuri associate official language movement; Meitei language movement in Assam; Manipuri language movement in Assam
- Type: social movement
- Theme: Language movement; Meitei language movement
- Cause: Exemption of all the candidates who do not appear the exams in either of the three mandatory languages, Assamese, Bodo or Bengali, without provisions of any alternative language, in job recruitments conducted by the Assam Public Service Commission (APSC) of the Government of Assam (Assam Public Services Competitive Examination (Amendment) Rules, 2019)
- Target: Inclusion of Meitei language (officially known as Manipuri language) as an associate official language of the Government of Assam; Inclusion of Meitei language in the job recruitment exams conducted by the Assam Public Service Commission (APSC)
- Patron: Government of Manipur
- Organised by: Government of Manipur; All Manipur Students' Union (AMSU); Assam Manipuri Meira Paibi Lup; Assam Manipuri Sahitya Parishad; All Assam Manipuri Muslim Youth Front; All Assam Manipuri Students Union (AAMSU); Guwahati Manipuri Coordination Committee (GMCC); Manipuri Youth Front of Assam (MYFA); Union of Association of Manipuri Writers; Youth's Action Committee for Protection of Indigenous People (YACPIP)
- Participants: Leishemba Sanajaoba, Member of Parliament, Rajya Sabha; Nongthombam Biren Singh, the Chief Minister of Manipur; Rajkumar Ranjan Singh, Member of Parliament, Lok Sabha

The social movement of Meitei language (officially known as Manipuri language) to be included as an associate official language of the Government of Assam is advocated by several literary, political, social associations and organisations as well as notable individual personalities of Northeast India (predominantly from Assam, Manipur and Tripura).

During November 2021, the Government of Assam declared the removal of mandatoriness of any particular language in the job recruitment exams conducted by the Assam Public Service Commission (APSC).

== Background ==
On 8 October 2020, Sarbananda Sonowal, the then Chief Minister of Assam, declared an announcement that the aspirants of the civil services from the Barak Valley who do not study either Assamese, Bodo or Bengali languages will not be allowed to appear in the qualifying language paper in the exams conducted by the Assam Public Service Commission (APSC) CEE.

The job recruitments conducted by the Assam Public Service Commission (APSC) of the Government of Assam has made it mandatory for all the candidates to appear job exams only in Assamese, Bodo or Bengali without providing any alternative language for people who studied in other languages like Meitei language in Assam, starting from primary level to above.

As some languages are made mandatory in the academics of Assam while Meitei language is not, in the near future, the disappearance of Meitei language in Assam will be the nearest possible outcome because students who do not choose the option for the mandatory languages in their educational careers are not allowed to appear in many Assam state government jobs. Due to such a law imposed by the Government of Assam, many students have hesitantly denied Meitei language medium in Assam.

== Efforts of socio-political leaders ==
During September 2020, Leishemba Sanajaoba, a Rajya Sabha MP of Manipur, urged Sarbananda Sonowal, the then Chief Minister of Assam, for the recognition of Meitei language as an 'associate' official language of Assam. According to him, with the recognition of Meitei language as an associate official language, the identity, history, culture and tradition of Manipuris residing in Assam could be protected and preserved. Earlier, Nongthombam Biren Singh, the Chief Minister of Manipur, had discussed with the Chief Minister of Assam, about the matter on the inclusion of Meitei language in the list of subjects in the examinations conducted by Assam Public Service Commission (APSC).

During December 2020, Rajkumar Ranjan Singh, a Member of Parliament of Lok Sabha, sought attention of the House for the recognition of Meitei language as an associate official language of Assam. Highlighting about the bill passed by the Assam Legislative Assembly introducing Assamese language as a mandatory subject in all the educational institutions in Assam from Class I to X, Ranjan said that Meitei language should be declared as an associate official language of Assam in accordance to the "Article 347" of the Indian Constitution, which is a special provision for the recognition of a language spoken by a section of the population of a State to be officially recognised entirely or partially of the state.

== Public grievances and protests ==
During July 2020, the "Youth's Action Committee for Protection of Indigenous People" (YACPIP) and the "Manipuri Youth Front of Assam" (MYFA), Silchar, demanded the recognition of Meitei language as associate official language of Assam so as the Manipuri people can apply for jobs in their mother language. The association sent a memorandum to the President of India through the Deputy Commissioner of Cachar. In the memorandum, they have stated that Meitei language is legitimate to be an associate official language in Assam, as there are 102 Meitei language medium schools recognised by Government of Assam and Meitei language is being taught in the schools since 1956 till present.

During September 2020, the Guwahati Manipuri Coordination Committee (GMCC) submitted a memorandum to Sarbananda Sonowal regarding the inclusion of Meitei language in the Assam Public Service Commission (APSC) examinations.

During October 2020, in reaction to the announcement of Assam Chief Minister, regarding the exemption of people, who do not study in either of the mandatory languages, from government job exams, various associations and organisations led by the "Manipuri Youths Front of Assam" (MYFA) burnt the effigy of Sarbananda Sonowal (the then Chief Minister) and Himanta Biswa Sarma (the then Education Minister). They demanded Meitei language to be declared as an associate official language in Assam.

During September 2021, the Central Committee of the "All Assam Manipuri Students Union" (AAMSU) demanded that Meitei language should be included as one of the associate official languages of Assam in order to protect the language from getting disappeared.

== Participant associations and organizations ==
- All Manipur Students' Union (AMSU)
- Assam Manipuri Meira Paibi Lup
- Assam Manipuri Sahitya Parishad
- All Assam Manipuri Muslim Youth Front
- All Assam Manipuri Students Union (AAMSU)
- Guwahati Manipuri Coordination Committee (GMCC)
- Manipuri Youth Front of Assam (MYFA)
- Union of Association of Manipuri Writers
- Youth's Action Committee for Protection of Indigenous People (YACPIP)

== Notable participant leaders ==
- Leishemba Sanajaoba, Member of Parliament, Rajya Sabha
- Nongthombam Biren Singh, the Chief Minister of Manipur
- Rajkumar Ranjan Singh, Member of Parliament, Lok Sabha

== Result ==
In 2024, the Government of Assam recognised Meitei language as the additional official language in all the three districts of the Barak Valley (Cachar district, Hailakandi district and Karimganj district) as well as in the Hojai district of Assam.

== See also ==
- Meitei nationalism
