= Bhanu Jayanti =

Observance celebrated in Nepal and India

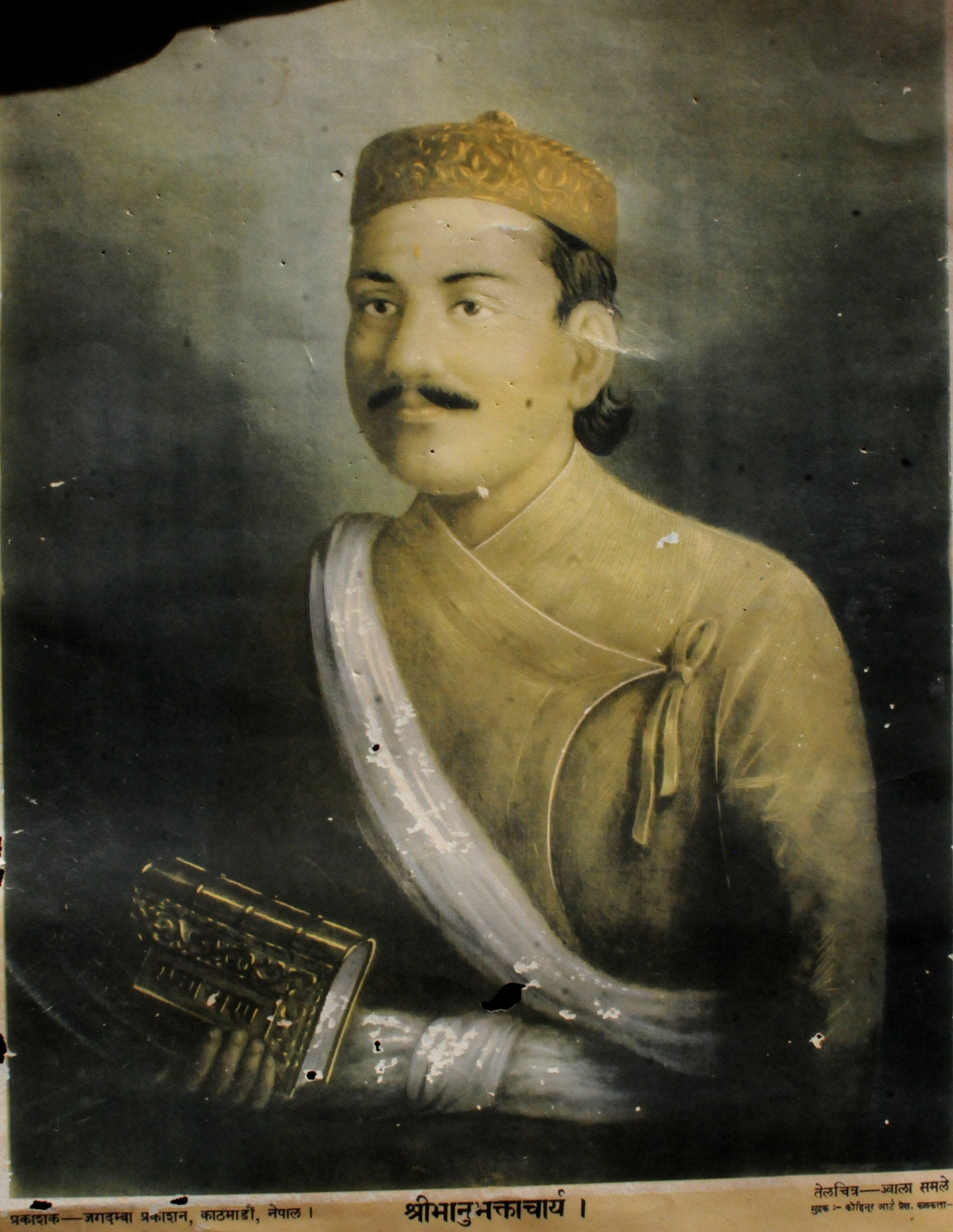
- Bhanubhakta Acharya
- Observed by: Nepal and India
- Type: Patriotic
- Significance: Commemorates the Nepali-language writer Bhanubhakta Acharya
- Date: 29th day of the Nepali month of Ashadha
- Frequency: Annual

Bhanu Jayanti (Nepali: भानु जयन्ती) is an observance annually celebrated on the 29th day of the Nepali month of Ashadha (13 July) to commemorate Nepali writer Bhanubhakta Acharya (1814– 1868) who translated the epic Ramayana from Sanskrit to Nepali for the first time. During the observance, many people add a garland to statues of Bhanubhakta, participate in the parades, and remember his contribution to the Nepali language.

== History ==
Bhanubhakta Acharya was born on 13 July 1814 (29 Ashadh 1871 BS) in the village of Chundi Ramgha, Tanahun District, Nepal. Acharya set out to translate the Valmiki Ramayana in the Nepali language, which is widely considered to be the first Nepali epic. Due to this, the author, Bhanubhakta Acharya is known as Adikavi (first poet) in Nepal.

== Celebrations ==
During Bhanu Jayanti, high officials including the President of Nepal, and the Prime Minister of Nepal remember Acharya's contribution to the Nepali language. The people who participate in the parades, chant slogans praising Bhanubhakta. The statues of Bhanubhakta throughout Nepal and India are garlanded.

== Bhanu Puraskar ==
During the occasion of Bhanu Jayanti, the Nepali Sahitya Parishad Sikkim, gives out prestigious award named after Bhanubhakta.
