= Chundi River =

River in the Tanahun District of Nepal

Coordinates: 27°57′22″N 84°25′21″E

Location
- Country: Nepal

The Chundi is a small river located in the western part of the Tanahun District of Nepal. It starts from around the Chandrawati Territory, which lies in Bhanu Municipality. Joined by several tributaries, it flows roughly 18 km in a north-to-south direction to its confluence with the River Marshyangdi near Bimalnagar. The river served as the border between Bhanu VDC and Barbhanjhyang VDC until 2015, when the two were merged to form Bhanu Municipality.

== Socioeconomic aspect ==
The river has served as the source for irrigation in Chundi basin fields since antiquity. The well known 'Barah Kulo' (Barah Canal) with its more than 150-year-long history maps the Chundi river water from 'Barah Bandh' (a small water dam) to the Chundi Basin fields. The Barah Bandh is located (where?). Many people including Manjhimen (Fishermen) use to fish in the river. Some sell them in the market while other fish for self. The river has also served the purpose of bathing, washing clothes and many more for local civilization. Nowadays due to increased population density, though the river has got little polluted in its lower parts, it still holds the dignity of crystal clear fresh water and has mesmerized many people those from heavily populated urban areas.

During monsoon (June–August) the river usually gains a very large size sometime reaching 10-15 times the 'non-monsoon annual average size', thus flooding into the surrounding lands. It thus cuts and wash away the nearby cultivable fields. The 'Chundi Bridge sepabagicha' which linked Barbhanjhyang and Bhanu VDC (located in Sepabagaicha) was annihilated by heavy flood in the year 1998, along with many other physical structures. Since then no major bridge were constructed over here until 2018. (The Government had reported the completion of design of 'Chundi khola bridge sepabagaicha' in 2016 and construction was started in the same year. It has recently been completed in 2018.)

Mishaps: Two to three (on average) cases of drowning and death in the river is reported annually. The victims are usually the young children playing or swimming in the river.

== Historical aspect ==
The first poet of Nepal, Aadikavi Bhanubhakta Acharya was born in Ramgha, Tanahun district. The name Ramgha is usually combined with Chundi thus becoming 'Chundi Ramgha'. The river Chundi flows through the lower level lands of base of Ramgha while the high land Ramgha stands there smiling over Chundi. The poet Bhanu grew in the surroundings of Chundi and ramgha. Many books mention his birthplace as 'Chundi Ramgha'.

== Tributaries of Chundi ==
Ladi khola and handi khola joins Chundi near syauli. Sisneri and bagua khola joins Chundi near sepabagaicha. Garam Khola joins Chundi at Bariphant. The river Chundi joins the River Marshyangdi in Bimalnagar.

== Bridges over Chundi ==
1. Chundi Bridge Dumre (Dumre, 50 m)
2. Low bridge Bangeraha (Bangeraha, ? m)
3. Chundi bridge Sepabagaicha (Sepabagaicha, Span 25m)
4. Suspension Bridge (Bangeraha)
