= Kushe Aunsi =

Nepalese Hindu Father's day

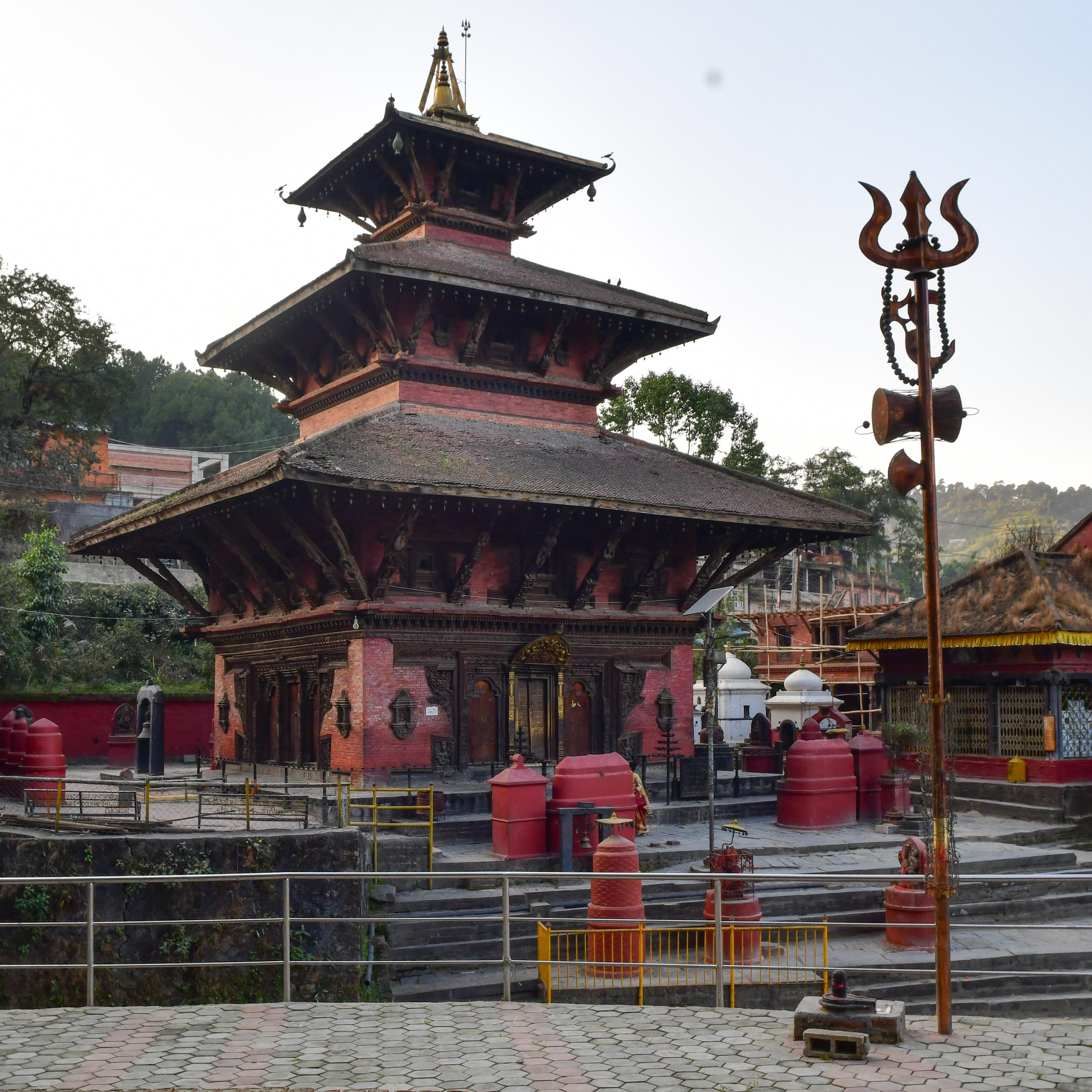
- People make pilgrimage to Gokarneshwor Mahadev temple on this day.
- Official name: Kushe Aunsi
- Also called: Gokarna Aunsi, Pitri Aunsi
- Observed by: Nepali Hindus
- Significance: Celebration of paternal relationship
- Celebrations: Shraddha, gift-giving
- Date: Bhādra māsa, kṛṣṇa pakṣa, amavasya tithi
- Frequency: Annual

Kushe Aunsi (Nepali: कुशे औंसी; Gokarna Aunsi or Buwa ko Mukh Herne Din) is a Nepalese Hindu lunar festival of celebrating fatherhood and paternal bonds, equivalent to the Father's Day celebration. The festival falls on the new moon day of the Hindu month of Bhadra (late August or early September). The cow-eared incarnation of Shiva— Gokarneswor Mahadev is also worshipped on this day.

Many people go to pilgrimage to Gokarneswor Mahadev temple, located in the northeastern part of Kathmandu, and they bathe and make offerings. People whose father has died also perform Shraddha (yearly death rituals).

== Etymology ==
Explanatory note on Hindu festival dates
- The Hindu calendar is lunisolar but most festival dates are specified using the lunar portion of the calendar. A lunar day is uniquely identified by three calendar elements: māsa (lunar month), pakṣa (lunar fortnight) and tithi (lunar day). Furthermore, when specifying the masa, one of two traditions are applicable, viz. amānta / pūrṇimānta. If a festival falls in the waning phase of the moon, these two traditions identify the same lunar day as falling in two different (but successive) masa. A lunar year is shorter than a solar year by about eleven days. As a result, most Hindu festivals occur on different days in successive years on the Gregorian calendar.

The festival falls on the day of new moon day known as Aunsi in Nepali. The word Kushe is derived from the word Kush, a holy plant in Hinduism. On this day, people bring new Kush plant into their home. The plant is worshipped as a symbol of Lord Bishnu.

The festival is also commonly known as Buwa ko Mukh Herne Din, literally translated as 'day to see one's father's face' in Nepali language. The children worship their father, feed him sweets and delicacies, and give him a gift as a part of the celebration.

The festival is also known as Gokarna Aunsi, literally translated as cow-eared (Gokarna) and new moon night (Aunsi).

Pitri Aunsi is another name of the festival. Pitri means spirits of the departed ancestors in Hindu culture. On this day, the spirits of the departed ancestors are also worshipped.

== Moti Jayanti ==
The birth anniversary of the prominent Nepalese poet Motiram Bhatta is celebrated on this day every year. Bhatta was born on the day of Kushe Aunsi in 1866. He also died on the same day in 1896 at the age of 30.

== See also ==
- Matatirtha Aunsi, Nepalese Mother's Day.
