= Motiram Bhatta =

Nepalese poet (1866–1896)

Yuba Kabi Motiram Bhatta
- मोतीराम भट्ट
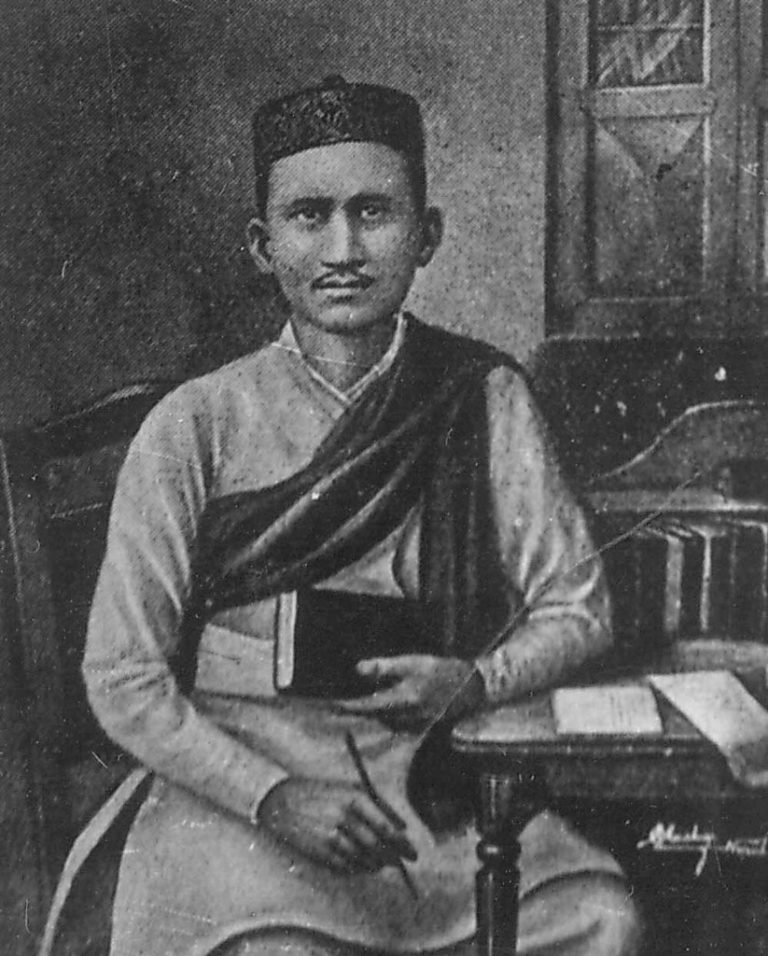
- Born: 8 September 1866; Kathmandu, Nepal
- Died: 1896 (aged 29–30); Kathmandu, Nepal
- Occupations: Poet, publisher
- Era: Motiram Bhatta Era
- Notable work: Kabi Bhanubhakta ko Jivan Charitra (Biography of Bhanubhakta Acharya)
- Parents: Daya Ram Bhatta (father); Ripu Mardini Devi Bhatta (mother)

Motiram Bhatta (Nepali: मोतीराम भट्ट; 1866–1896) was a Nepalese poet, singer, essayist, publisher, literary critic and biographer. He is considered the first biographer and literary critic of Nepali literature and is credited for starting the first private printing press in Nepal c. 1888. He also introduced the Ghazal style of poetry and singing in Nepal. Bhatta was a polyglot and alongside Nepali, he had studied in Sanskrit, Persian, and English and was also proficient in Bengali, Urdu and Nepal Bhasa.

He wrote Kabi Bhanubhakta Ko Jivan Charitra, the biography of Bhanubhakta Acharya, which played a significant role in establishing Acharya as the first poet (Aadi Kabi) of the Nepali language. He is considered one of the seventeen national heroes (Rastriya Bibhuti) of Nepal and was given the title Yuba Kabi (Young Poet). The 1883 to 1919 period of Nepali literature is known as the Motiram Era.

== Early life in Benaras ==
Bhatta was born on the day of Kushe Aunsi (the new moon day of the Hindu month Bhadra) on 8 September 1866 (25 Bhadra 1923 BS) in Bhosiko Tole, Kathmandu, Nepal, as the second son to father Pandit Daya Ram Bhatta and mother Ripu Mardini Devi Bhatta. At the age of six he left his birthplace, Kathmandu, with his mother to receive education in Benaras, India. He was admitted to a Persian-language school, where he learnt Persian and Urdu. His Bratabanda ceremony was also performed in Benaras. He became acquainted to Bharatendu Harishchandra in Benaras and studied under him. He started writing and singing ghazals at this period. He also started learning music and played sitar. He learnt sitar from Pannalal, a famous sitar player in Benaras. He wrote around 400 shayaris when he was in Benaras.

== Marriage ==
He returned to Kathmandu in 1937 BS (1880–1881) at the age of 15 and got married. After marriage, he stayed in Kathmandu for some time. Until he returned to Kathmandu, he had not written any songs or poems in the Nepali language but when he came back, he started to learn about the Nepalese singing tradition. He was charmed by the folk duet song (Dohori) sung in rural Nepal.

While in Kathmandu, he attended the wedding ceremony of his neighbour Khadga Dutta Pandey. In the ceremony, he heard a poem of Bhanubhakta Acharya being recited by the wedding guests. The wedding guests sang that poem throughout the night. He discovered that those songs were written by Bhanubhakta Acharya. He liked the poem so much that he was determined to find out other poems and works of Bhanubhakta Acharya.

== Return to Benaras ==
He returned to Benaras with his wife in December 1881 (Poush 1938 BS). He started studying English in Harischandra school in Benaras. In his second stay at Benaras, he attended various poetry meetings. One such meeting was organized by Bharatendu Harishchandra on samasyāpūrtis, an old poetic tradition involving riddles. Samasyāpūrtis were an early Indian tradition often organized in palaces of kings and nobles. It is said that in one of the samasyāpūrtis meeting, Bhatta presented a solution and was awarded ten rupees by Harishchandra. Impressed by the meetings, Bhatta started a group himself called Samasyāpūrti–maṇḍalī, which consisted of Padmavilas Panta, Kashinath, Ranganath, Tejbahadur Rana, and Chet Singh. In the group meetings, he started composing poems using an erotic or romantic style (Sringara ras in Sanskrit). The style attracted numbers of publications among readers and was considered successful.

In Benaras, he published and edited a Nepali-language edition of Bharat Jeevan magazine. He also started printing Nepali-language books in the Bharat Jeevan Printing Press. He first published the Balakanda of Bhanubhakta Ramayan and printed the complete edition later.

In 1886, he started Gorkha Bharat Jeevan, a Nepali-language magazine. It is considered to be the first newsmagazine published in Nepali. However, no copies of the magazine have been found to date. The only evidence of the existence of the magazine is the advertisement of the magazine in Bharat Jeevan magazine.

== Return to Kathmandu ==
After around seven years of living in Benaras, he returned to Kathmandu in 1945 BS (1888–1889). After returning, Bhatta, with the help of his maternal uncles Pt. Nara Dev Pandey and Krishna Dev Pandey, started Motikrishna Dhirendra Company in 1945 BS (1888–1889) in Thahiti, Kathmandu. At the same time, he opened a library, which is considered the first library in Nepal. The company later opened a press known as Pashupat Press.

He, alongside Nara Dev Pandey, Laxmi Dutta Panta, Gopi Nath Lohani, Bhoj Raj Pandey and other friends and acquaintances, started a group in Kathmandu called Mitra Mandali, inspired by his group in Benaras. The group was responsible for the creation and promotion of Nepali poetry. Bhatta studied in Durbar High School in Kathmandu. He was friends with Chandra Shumsher JBR and Dev Shumsher JBR at school. The liberal views of Dev Shumsher are said to have been influenced by Bhatta. For his higher education, he decided to go to Calcutta.

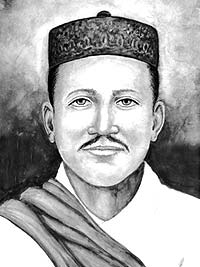
Sketch of Motiram Bhatta

== Calcutta and death ==
In 1948 BS (1891–1892), he passed the entrance examination of Calcutta University. He appeared for the AAIA exam in 1950 BS (1893–1894) but was unable to pass. He returned to his home. He went back to Kolkata in 1952 BS (1895–1896) but became ill. He returned to Kathmandu due to his illness. He became bedridden for seven months and died in 1896 (1953 BS) on the day of Kunse Aunsi, his lunar birthday at the age of 30. He was cremated at Aryaghat on the banks of the Bagmati River.

== Literary contributions ==
He is credited for the introduction of prose writing in Nepali literature. He wrote essays, plays and stories in the Nepali language. In poetry he mostly used Sringar ras, which is considered a romantic style.

He worked for 15 years in Nepali literature. During that period he wrote and edited about twenty–five literary works. He also published works by other authors.

Some of the works of Motiram are Manodweg Prawah, Panchak Prapancha, Shakuntala, Priyadarsika and Pikdoot. He also wrote some Hindi and Urdu poems. He was the one who introduced "Ghazals" in Nepali literature. His sher "Dui aankhi bhau ta tayaar chhan tarbar po kina chahiyo, timi aafai malik bhaigayeu sarkar kina chahiyo" is quite famous for the ghazal lovers in Nepal, which translates to "Two eyebrows are sharp enough, why should there be a need for a sword, you happen to be a monarch yourself, why should there be a need for a vote?"

== Notable works ==
=== Nepali ===
- Manod Beg Prawah (poetry collection, 1942 BS)
- Pralahad Bhakti Katha (epic, 1943 BS)
- Gajendra Moksha (epic, 1944 BS)
- Shakunouti (study of omens, 1944 BS)
- Swapna Adhyaya (study of dreams, 1944 BS)
- Gafastak (1944 BS)
- Shakuntal (play, 1944 BS)
- Sangeet Chandrodaya (ghazals, 1944 BS)
- Panchak Prapancha (epic, 1944 BS)
- Usha Charitra (epic, 1944 BS)
- Anupras Manjari (1944 BS)
- Chanakya Neeti (1945 BS)
- Padmavati (play, incomplete, 1945 BS)
- Pikdoot (epic, 1945 BS)
- Kashiraj Chandrasena (epic, 1945 BS)
- Gulsanovar (fiction, 1945 BS)
- Ukhanko Bakhan
- Kaal Bhramar Sambad (epic)
- Baal Jibbarnan (poem)
- Priyadarsika (play, 1948 BS)
- Kabi Bhanubhakta Ko Jivan Charitra (Bhanubhakta Acharya's biography and criticism, 1891, 1948 BS)
- Teej ko Katha

=== Urdu ===
- Husna Afroz Aaram Dil (play)

== Legacy ==
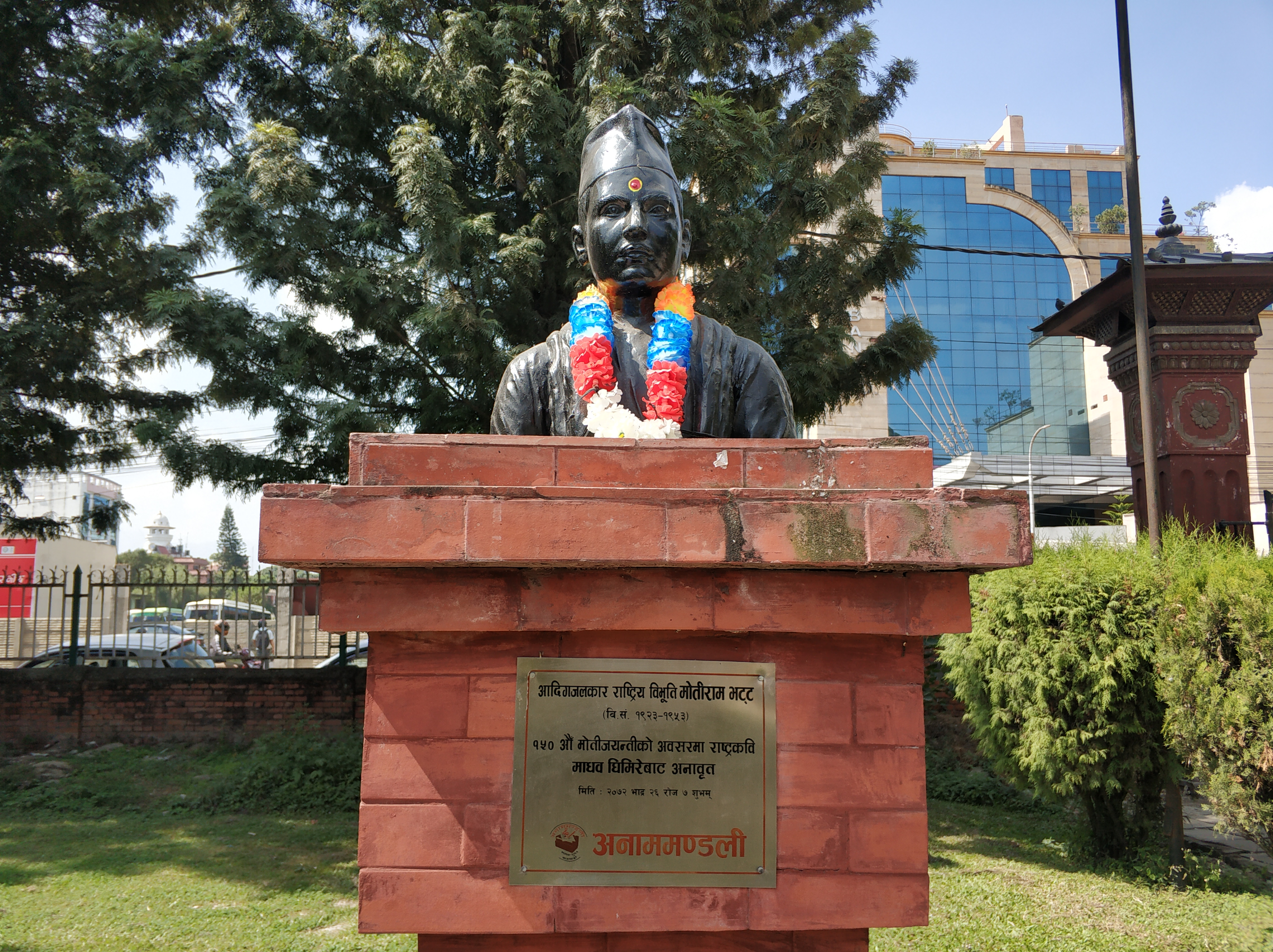
Statue of Motiram Bhatta at Nepal Academy Kamaladi, Kathmandu.

Motiram Jayanti, his anniversary, is celebrated every year by the Nepali literary community on the day of Kushe Aunsi (Nepalese father's day). The Yuba Barsa Moti Prize, an award to honour writers who have contributed to Nepali literature, was established in his honour by the Nepal Educational Council in 2042 BS (1985–1986). The award is presented every year on his anniversary.

His biography, Kabi Motiram Bhattako Sachitra Charitra Barnan, was written by his maternal uncle and fellow littérateur Nara Dev Pandey.
