= Nara Dev Pandey =

Nepali writer and publisher (1872–1944)

Pandit Nara Dev Pandey
- नरदेव पाण्डे
- Born: 1929 BS (1872—1873); Bhonsiko Tole, Kathmandu, Nepal
- Died: 24 April 1944 (aged −71–72); Aryaghat, Pashupati, Kathmandu
- Occupations: Publisher, writer, editor
- Known for: Writing biography of Motiram Bhatta
- Parents: Uma Dev Pandey (father); Shiva Priya Pandey (mother)
- Relatives: Motiram Bhatta (nephew)

Nara Dev Pandey (1872 – 1944) was a Nepalese poet, writer and publisher. He served as the first talukdar (manager) of Gorkhapatra, one of the earliest Nepali newspaper. He ran the first private printing press— Pashupat press located in Thahiti, Kathmandu. He was part of a literary team known as Moti Mandali, alongside Motiram Bhatta. He is considered one of the eminent figure of Secondary era (Madhyamik Kaal) of Nepali literature.

== Biography ==
He was born in 1929 BS (1872-1873) in Bhosiko Tole, Kathmandu to father Uma Dev Pandey and mother Shiva Priya Devi. He obtained a Madhyama degree in Sanskrit from Benaras.

His printing press, Pashupat Press published Gorkhapatra in its earliest days. He was appointed the Talukdar (manager) of Gorkhapatra. He managed the newspaper till September 1903 (1960 Bhadra). He also edited the first Nepali literary magazine—Sudhasagar.

He was a part of a literary group called Moti Mandal. The group was formed by the poet and Pandey's nephew, Motiram Bhatta.

He also wrote Kabi Motiram Bhattako Sachitra Charitra Barnan, the biography of Motiram Bhatta. The biography was published with the help of Major-General Mrigendra Shumsher JBR, who was the incumbent Director of Public Instructions under the prime-ministership of Juddha Shumsher JBR.

== Notable works ==
- Shree Ganesha Sraswati Strota (1950 BS)
- Birbal Chaturi (1956 BS)
- Adhbut Milap (1958 BS)
- Merina Charitra (1959 BS)
- Shankhamul Yatra (1959 BS)
- Chandra Bhati Prakash (1962 BS)
- Kabi Motiram Bhattako Sachitra Charitra Barnan

== Personal life and death ==
He was married four times. He did not have any offspring with his first and second wife. He then married Munu Devi, with whom he had a son. After ten months of the birth of their son, Munu Devi died. He then married Gandharba Rajkumari Tiwari, with whom he had three sons and four daughters. He was the maternal uncle of the eminent poet, Motiram Bhatta. He was about six years younger than Bhatta. He died on 24 April 1944 (12 Baisakh 2001 BS) in Aryaghat, Pashupatinath Temple, Kathmandu.

== See also ==
- Motiram Bhatta
- Jaya Prithvi Bahadur Singh
