= Bhanubhakta Ramayana =

Nepali translation of Ramayana

Bhanubhaktako Ramayana
- Author: Bhanubhakta Acharya
- Original title: भानुभक्तको रामायण
- Language: Nepali
- Genre: Mythology, Religious
- Publisher: Sajha Prakashan
- Publication date: 1887
- Publication place: Nepal
- Pages: 256
- ISBN: 9789993325970

Bhanubhakta Ramayana (Nepali: भानुभक्त रामायण), commonly known as Ramayan, is the Nepali translation of Valmiki Ramayana by Adikavi Bhanubhakta Acharya. It was posthumously published in its complete form in 1887. It is widely considered to be the first Nepali epic. The prose style of the epic has been termed Bhanubhaktiya Laya since it was completely original in Nepali literature, being the first work. Due to this distinction, the author, poet Bhanubhakta Acharya is known as Adikavi (first poet) in Nepal.

== Background ==
The epic is considered to have been a major first step to "democratising" Hinduism in Nepal as it allowed the general public access to one of the two pillars of Hindu Itihasa in their native language, diminishing the hegemony of learned Brahmin priests in the study and interpretation of sacred texts. On the other hand, many denounce the role the work played as an instrument to establishing the hegemony of the Nepali language and literature in Nepal at the expense of other indigenous languages.
The book and the poet is held in high regard in ethnic Nepali communities outside Nepal as well, especially in Darjeeling. This, the first Nepali epic, also established Shardulvikridit Chhanda as the most important and used poetic meter for Nepali language.

== Development and publication history ==
Bhanubhakta Ramayana was translated mostly from Valmiki Ramayana with minor variations (without changing the story) in details introduced by Bhanubhakta himself. He had completed the translation of Balkanda chapter by 1844. Yuddhakanda and Uttarkanda had been translated by 1853. Bhanubhakta died in 1869. The Balakanda section was published by Motiram Bhatta in 1884 and the complete Bhanubhakta Ramayana was published in 1887.

== Adaptations ==
The book has been translated into many other languages, including English. The audio tapes of the epic were also broadcast as part of the early morning religious broadcast by Radio Nepal in the 1990s. Music Nepal also released audio cassettes of the recital around the same time. Various excerpts from the epic are regarded as valuable short poems on their own, and have been included in various textbooks of Nepali language and literature.

== See also ==
- Muna Madan
- Ramayana
- Madhabi
