= Nepali grammar =

Grammatical rules and syntax in the Nepali language

Nepali grammar is the morphology and syntax of Nepali, an Indo-European language spoken in South Asia.

== Morphology ==
=== Nouns ===
Nepali nouns that denote male and female beings are sometimes distinguished by suffixation or through pairs of lexically differing terms. Thus one pattern involves masculine -o/ā vs feminine -ī suffixes (e.g. chorā "son" : chorī "daughter", buṛho "old man" : buṛhī "old woman"), while another such phenomenon is that of the derivational feminine suffix -nī (e.g. chetrī "Chetri" : chetrīnī "Chetri woman", kukur "dog" : kukurnī "female dog"). Beyond this, nouns are otherwise not overtly marked (i.e. inanimate nouns, abstract nouns, all other animates).

Overall, in terms of grammatical gender, among Indo-Aryan languages, Nepali possesses an "attenuated gender" system, in which "gender accord typically is restricted to female animates (so that the system is essentially restructured as zero/+Fem), optional or loose even then […], and greatly reduced in syntactic scope. […] In Nepali, the [declensional] ending is a neutral -o, changeable to -ī with Personal Feminines in more formal style."

Nepali distinguishes two numbers, with a common pluralizing suffix for nouns in -harū (e.g. mitra "friend" : mitraharū "friends"). Unlike the English plural it is not mandatory, and may be left unexpressed if plurality is already indicated in some other way: e.g. by explicit numbering, or agreement. Riccardi (2003:554) further notes that the suffix "rarely indicates simple plurality: it often means that other objects of the same or a like class are also indicated and may be translated as 'and other things'."

=== Adjectives ===
Adjectives may be divided into declinable and indeclinable categories. Declinables are marked, through termination, for the gender and number of the nouns they qualify. The declinable endings are -o for the "masculine" singular, -ī for the feminine singular, and -ā for the plural. e.g. sāno kitāb "small book", sānī keṭī "small girl", sānā kalamharū "small pens".

"Masculine", or rather "neutral" -o is the citation form and the otherwise overwhelmingly more encountered declension, as previously noted, gender in Nepali is attenuated and accord "typically is restricted to female animates", and "optional or loose even then". However, "In writing, there has been a strong tendency by some to extend the use of feminine markers beyond their use in speech to include the consistent marking of certain adjectives with feminine endings. This tendency is strengthened by some Nepali grammars and may be reinforced by the influence of Hindi upon both speech and writing."

Indeclinable adjectives are completely invariable, and can end in either consonants or vowels (except -o).

- Examples of declinable adjectives: ṭhūlo "big", rāmro "good", seto "white", sāno "small".
- Examples of indeclinable adjectives: garīb "poor", saphā "clean", dhanī "rich", nayā̃ "new".

=== Postpositions ===
In Nepali the locus of grammatical function or "case-marking" lies within a system of agglutinative suffixes or particles known as postpositions, which parallel English's prepositions. There is a number of such one-word primary postpositions:

- ko – genitive marker; variably declinable in the manner of an adjective. X ko/kī/kā Y has the sense "X's Y", with ko/kī/kā agreeing with Y.
- lāī – marks the indirect object (hence named "dative marker"), or, if definite, the direct object.
- le – both instrumental and ergative marker; in its latter capacity it is applied to the subject obligatorily in the transitive perfective/perfect and optionally in other transitive aspects.
- mā – general locative marker; "in, at, on", etc.
- bhandā – an ablative postposition used for comparatives and along with adverbs for compound postpositions.
- Riccardi (2003:557) lists the following other common primary postpositions: tala "below", muni "under", dekhi "from", bāṭa "from", sãga "with", sita "with", pachi "after", samma "up to", bittikai "as soon as".

Beyond this come compound postpositions, composed of a primary postposition (most likely ko or bhandā) plus an adverb.

- ko lāgi "for", ko pachāṛī "behind", ko viruddha "against", bhandā māthi "above", bhandā par "beyond", etc.

=== Pronouns ===
Nepali has personal pronouns for the first and second persons, while third person forms are of demonstrative origin, and can be categorized deictically as proximate and distal. The pronominal system is quite elaborate, by reason of its differentiation on lines of sociolinguistic formality. In this respect it has three levels or grades of formality/status: low, middle, and high (see T-V distinction for further clarification). Pronouns do not distinguish gender.

The first person singular pronoun is म ma, and the first person plural is हामी hāmī. The following table lists the second and third person singular forms.

	2nd pn.	3rd pn.		
	2nd pn.	Prox.	Dist.	
Low	तँ tã	यो yo (यस yas)	त्यो tyo (त्यस tyas)	ऊ ū (उस us)
Middle	तिमी timī	यिनी yinī (यिन yin)	तिनी tinī (तिन tin)	उनी unī (उन un)
High	तपाईं tapāī̃	यहाँ yahā̃		वहाँ wahā̃

yo and tyo have yī and tī as plurals, while other pronouns pluralize (including hāmī, for emphasis, but excluding ū) with the common suffix -harū. Also, bracketed beside of a number of forms in the above chart are their oblique counterparts, used when they (as demonstrative pronouns) or that which they qualify (as demonstrative determiners) are followed by a postposition. However, the need to oblique weakens the longer distance between demonstrative and postposition gets. Also, one exception which does not require obliquing is -sãga "with".

=== Verbs ===
Verbs in Nepali are quite highly inflected, agreeing with the subject in number, gender, status and person. They also inflect for tense, mood, and aspect. As well as these inflected finite forms, there are also a large number of participial forms.

Possibly the most important verb in Nepali, as well as the most irregular, is the verb हुनु hunu 'to be, to become'. In the simple present tense, there are at least three conjugations of हुनु hunu, only one of which is regular. The first, the ho-conjugation is, broadly speaking, used to define things, and as such its complement is usually a noun. The second, the cha-conjugation is used to describe things, and the complement is usually an adjectival or prepositional phrase. The third, the huncha-conjugation, is used to express regular occurrences or future events, and also expresses 'to become' or 'to happen'.

They are conjugated as follows:

Simple Present conjugation of the verb हुनु hunu
	हो ho	छ cha	हुन्छ huncha
First person singular	हुँ hũ	छु chu	हुन्छु hunchu
First person plural	हौँ haũ	छौँ chaũ	हुन्छौँ hunchaũ
Second person singular low-grade	होस् hos	छस् chas	हुन्छस् hunchas
Second person middle-grade/plural	हौ hau	छौ chau	हुन्छौ hunchau
High grade	हुनुहन्छ hunuhuncha	हुनुहन्छ hunuhuncha	हुनुहन्छ hunuhuncha
Third person singular low-grade	हो ho	छ cha	हुन्छ huncha
Third person middle-grade/plural masculine	हुन् hun	छन् chan	हुन्छन् hunchan
Third person middle-grade/plural feminine	हुन् hun	छिन् chin	हुन्छिन् hunchin

हुनु hunu also has two suppletive stems in the simple past, namely भ- bha- (the use of which corresponds to the huncha-conjugation) and थि- thi- (which corresponds to both the cha and ho-conjugations) which are otherwise regularly conjugated. भ- bha- is also the stem used in the formation of the various participles.

The finite forms of regular verbs are conjugated as follows (using गर्नु garnu 'to do' as an example):

Finite forms of गर्नु garnu 'to do'
	Simple Present/Future	Probable Future	Simple Past	Past Habitual	Injunctive	Imperative
First person singular	गर्छु garchu 'I (will) do'	गरुँला garũlā 'I will (probably) do'	गरेँ garẽ 'I did'	गर्थेँ garthẽ 'I used to do'	गरुँ garũ 'may I do'	–
First person plural	गर्छौँ garchaũ 'We (will) do'	गरौँला garaũlā 'We will (probably) do'	गर्यौ garyaũ 'We did'	गर्थ्यौँ garthyaũ 'We used to do'	गरौँ garaũ 'may we do, let's do'	–
Second person singular low-grade	गर्छस् garchas 'you (will) do'	गर्लास् garlās 'you will (probably) do'	गरिस् garis 'you did'	गर्थिस् garthis 'you used to do'	गरेस् gares 'may you do'	गर् gar 'do!'
Second person middle-grade/plural	गर्छौ garchau 'you (will) do'	गरौला garaulā 'you will (probably) do'	गर्यौ garyau 'you did'	गर्थ्यौ garthyau 'you used to do'	गरौ garau 'may you do'	गर gara 'do'
High grade	गर्नुहुन्छ garnuhuncha 'you (will) do'	गर्नुहोला garnuhola 'you will (probably) do'	गर्नुभयो garnubhayo 'you did'	गर्नुहुन्थ्यो garnuhunthyo 'you used to do'	गर्नुहोस् garnuhos 'may you do, please do'	–
Third person singular low-grade	गर्छ garcha 'he does'	गर्ला garlā 'he will (probably) do'	गर्यो garyo 'he did'	गर्थ्यो garthyo 'he used to do'	गरोस् garos 'may he do'	–
Third person middle-grade/plural masculine	गर्छन् garchan 'they (will) do'	गर्लान् garlān 'they will (probably) do'	गरे gare 'they did'	गर्थे garthe 'they used to do'	गरून् garūn 'may they do'	–
Third person middle-grade/plural feminine	गर्छिन् garchin 'she (will) do'	गर्लिन् garlin 'she will (probably) do'	गरिन् garin 'she did'	गर्थिन् garthin 'she used to do'	गरुन् garūn 'may she do'	–

As well as these, there are two forms which are infinitival and participial in origin, but are frequently used as if they were finite verbs. Again using गर्नु garnu as an example, these are गरेको gareko 'did' and गर्ने garne 'will do'. Since they are simpler than the conjugated forms, these are often overused by non-native speakers, which can sound stilted.

The eko-participle is also the basis of perfect constructions in Nepali. This is formed by using the auxiliary verb हुनु hunu (usually the cha-form in the present tense and the thi-form in the past) with the eko-participle. So, for example, मैले काम गरेको छु maile kām gareko chu means 'I have done (the) work'.

==== Infinitives ====
Nepali has two infinitives. The first is formed by adding -नु nu to the verb stem. This is the citation form of the verb, and is used in a number of constructions, the most important being the construction expressing obligation. This is formed by combining the nu-infinitive with the verb पर्नु parnu 'to fall'. This is an impersonal construction, which means that the object marker -लाई lāī is often added to the agent, unless the verb is transitive, in which case the ergative/instrumental case marker -ले le is added. So, for example, I have to do work would be translated as मैले काम गर्नुपर्छ maile kām garnuparcha. It is also used with the postposition -अघि aghi 'before'. गर्नुअघि garnuaghi, then, means 'before doing'.

The second infinitive is formed by adding -न na to the verb stem. This is used in a wide variety of situations, and can generally be used where the infinitive is used in English. For example, म काम गर्न रामकहाँ गएको थिएँ ma kām garna rāmkahā̃ gaeko thiẽ 'I had gone to Ram's place to do work'.

== Bibliography ==
- Masica, Colin (1991), The Indo-Aryan Languages, Cambridge: Cambridge University Press, ISBN 978-0-521-29944-2.
- Hutt, Michael; Subedi, Abhi (1999), Teach Yourself Nepali (2003 ed.), McGraw-Hill, ISBN 978-0-07-142468-4.
- Riccardi, Theodore (2003), "Nepali", in Cardona, George; Jain, Dhanesh (eds.), The Indo-Aryan Languages, Routledge, pp. 538–579, ISBN 978-0-415-77294-5.
