= Bhanubhakta Acharya =

Nepalese poet (1814- 1868)

Aadikabi Bhanubhakta Acharya
- भानुभक्त आचार्य
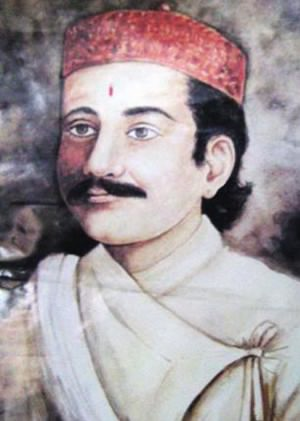
- Portrait of Bhanubhakta Acharya
- Born: 13 July 1814; Chundi Ramgha, Tanahu District, Kingdom of Nepal (present-day Nepal)
- Died: 1868 (aged 53–54); Setighat, Tanahun, Kingdom of Nepal (present-day Nepal)
- Occupation: Poet
- Era: Bhanubhakta era
- Notable work: Bhanubhakta Ramayan, Ghansi

Bhanubhakta Acharya (Nepali: भानुभक्त आचार्य) (1814—1868 CE; 1871—1925 BS) was a Nepalese writer, poet, and translator. He is widely regarded as the oldest poet in the Nepali language, for which he was conferred with the title of Aadikabi (Nepali: आदिकवि; lit. The first poet).

He is best known for translating the epic Ramayana from Sanskrit to Nepali for the first time. Initially, his translation of the Ramayana was popular in oral form. It was later compiled and published by Motirām Bhatta in the late 19th century as Bhanubhakta Ramayana

== Early life and education ==
Bhanubhakta Acharya was born on 13 July 1814 (29 Ashadh 1871 BS) in the village of Chundi Ramgha, Tanahun District, Nepal in a Kanyakubja Bahun family of Dhananjaya Acharya, and Dharmawati Acharya. His father Dhananjaya Acharya was a government official and was the eldest of all brothers. Bhanubhakta received his primary education of Sanskrit at his home by his grandfather and later in Varanasi.

== Literary career ==
South Asian languages including the Nepali language were limited mostly to an oral medium of language dissemination at the time with little written context and literary influence. As most of the written texts of South Asia were dominated by Sanskrit, it was mostly inaccessible to the general populace. As the Monks and Bahuns were the caste who excelled as teachers, scholars, and priests, the access to all of the religious scriptures and other literary works was only limited to them, and few who also could receive education and understand Sanskrit. Many poets had written poems in Sanskrit while Acharya started to write in the Nepali language which not only popularized the language but also gained him acceptance from the Rana Rulers.

Acharya's benevolence towards Ram's heroic exploits brought in him an urgency to make his tale accessible to the people who spoke Nepali. Since most people did not understand the Sanskrit language, he translated the epic into the Nepali language. Preserving the lyrical narration style of Ramayana his translations are believed by scholars to carry the same lyrical essence "Bhava and Marma (भव र मर्म)" that rather than sounding like a poem sounded more like a song without distorting the regional influence or the inner meaning of the Ramayana.

He did not receive any western education nor was familiar with foreign literature which kept his work and experiential journey original to the vernacular literary system and brought strong Nepali flavor to his works. The key features of his writings were simple yet strong with a sense of religion, a sense of simplicity, and the warmth of his country that not many other poets had been able to be compared. Belonging to a wealthy family, he never had any financial trouble and had an unremarkable life until he met a grass cutter who wanted to give something to society so he could be remembered after death too. The grass cutter's words were what inspired him to do something that would leave a mark on society.

He wrote two masterpieces in his life among which, one is the Bhanubhaktey Ramayan and the other is a letter he wrote in verse form to the Prime Minister while he was in prison. He was made a scapegoat and sent to prison due to some misunderstanding in signing the papers. In prison, his health deteriorated and he was given false hopes of being set free but his case was not even heard. So, he wrote a petition to the Prime Minister requesting his freedom, which later became one of his great works. He not only won his freedom with his poem but was also given a bag of money, for he wrote in the same language the then prime minister wanted to force the public to use. When he died in 1868, he did not know he would one day be one of the most revered poets of Nepal. His creation, however, was not published and he died without receiving credit for his contribution.

His works were published by Motiram Bhatta in 1887 after he found the manuscript and took it to Benaras, India for printing. One of Acharya's works is well known for its colorful, glowing praise of Kathmandu valley and its inhabitants. Although he is one of the most celebrated and revered poets of Nepal, his works are not as famous as other poets in the history of Nepali literature. Ramayana, which Acharya originally translated into Nepali, was also translated into English more than a century later; it is considered the first translation in English that is published in Nepal.

== Notable works ==
=== Poems ===
- Bhanubhakta Ramayana
- Amarawati Kantipuri Nagari
- Ghasi
- Badhu Shiksha
- Bhaktamala
- Khawmit Yes Girdhari Le
- Roj Roj Darshan Paunchhu (Bholi Kabita)
- Ma Bhanubhakta
- Balaji Dekhyan
- Prashnottar Mala

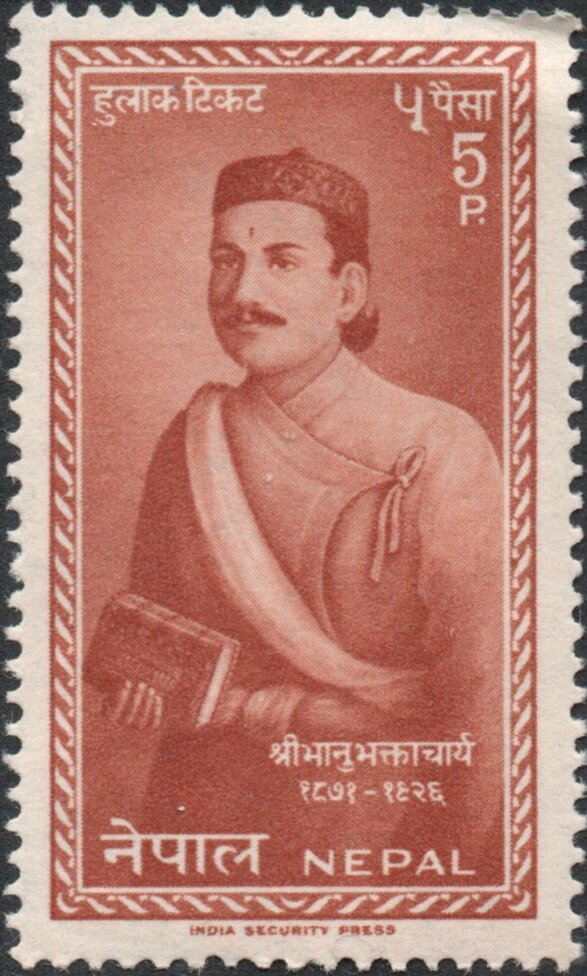
Post stamp issued in Acharya's honour

== Legacy ==
Bhanubhakta Acharya is revered and honoured with the title of Aadakabi (First-ever Poet) of Nepali language. Motiram Bhatta, first referred to him as Adikavi while writing Acharya's biography in 1981. He clarifies that Acharya is not called Aadikavi because he was the first poet in Nepal but he deserved the title as he was the first poet who wrote with an understanding of the Marma (inner essence) of the poetry.

Bhanu Jayanti is a celebration of the birth anniversary of Bhanubhakta Acharya. It falls on the 29th day of the month of Ashad according to Nepali calendar. It is celebrated every year by the Government of Nepal and Nepalese people as well as by the Nepali speaking people around the world. cultural festival, prevalent among the Nepalese around the world in the remembrance of Bhanubhakta Acharya's birthday anniversary. It is generally celebrated on 13 July or the 29th day of the Nepali month of Ashad.

Every year Bhanu Jayanti is celebrated with literary seminars, and programs with many Nepalese writers, novelists, and other literary figures/enthusiasts.

== Gallery ==
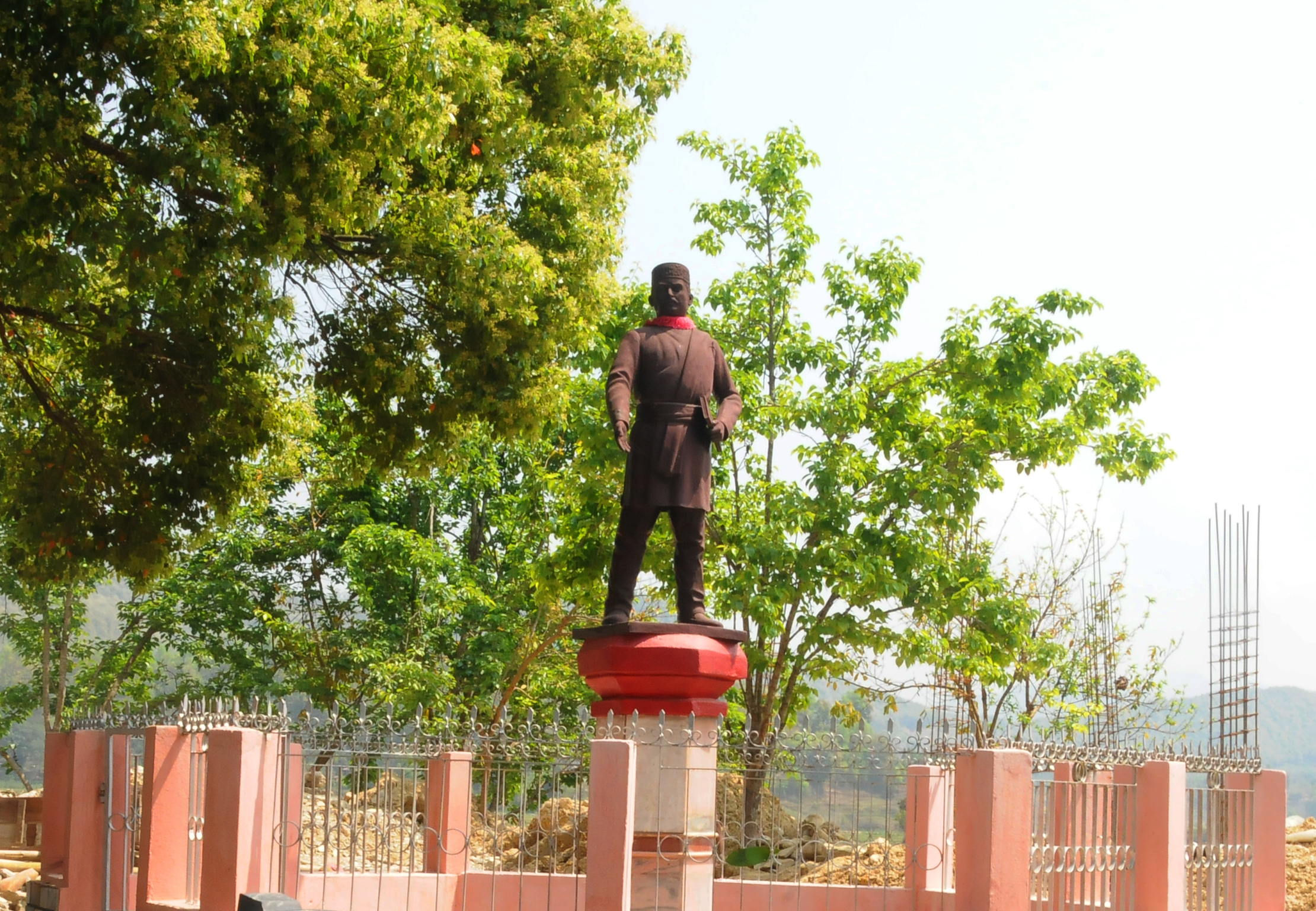
Statue of Bhanubhakta Acharya at Chundi Ramgha

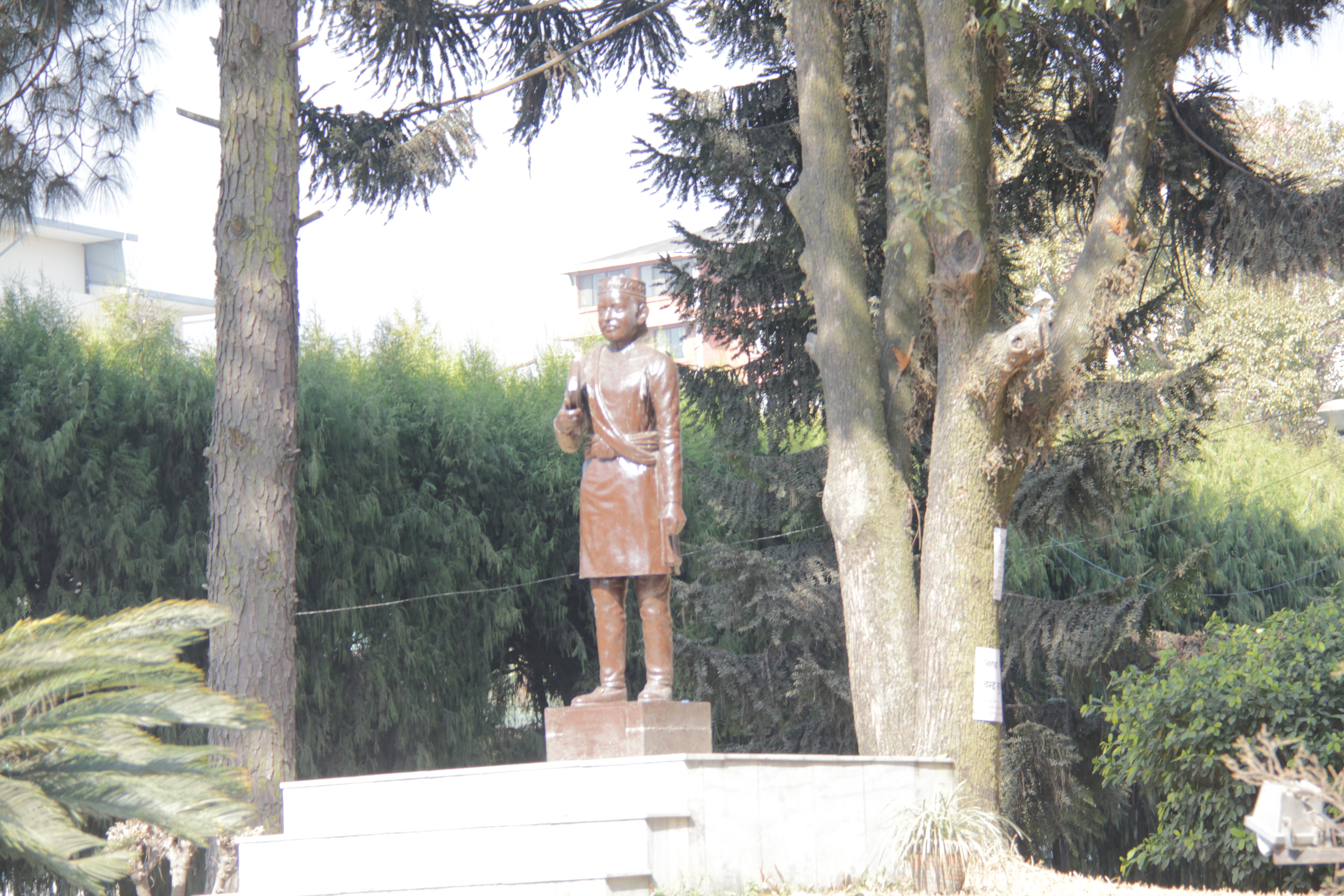
Bhanubhakta's statue at Nepal Academy

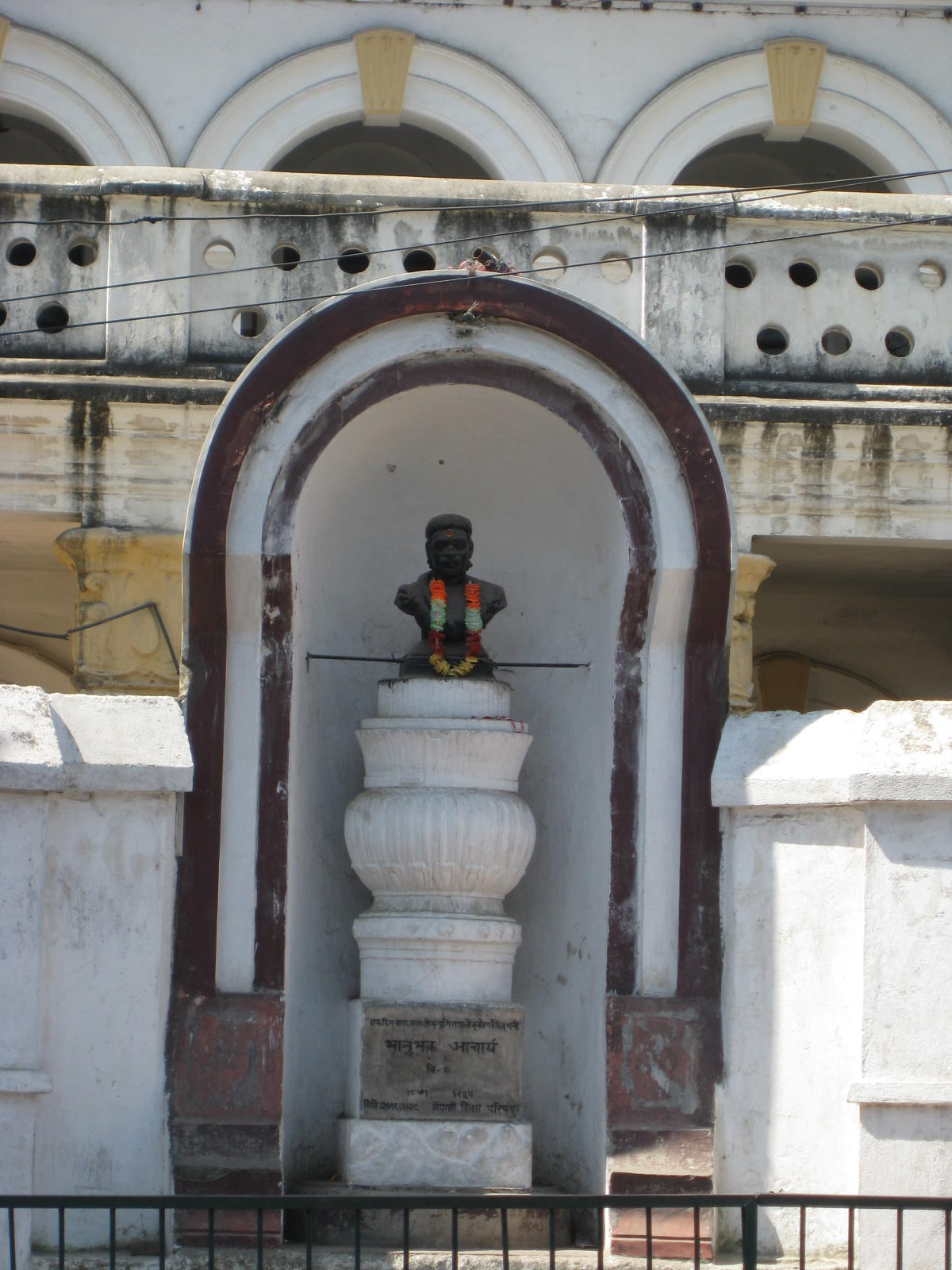
Bust of Bhanubhakta Acharya

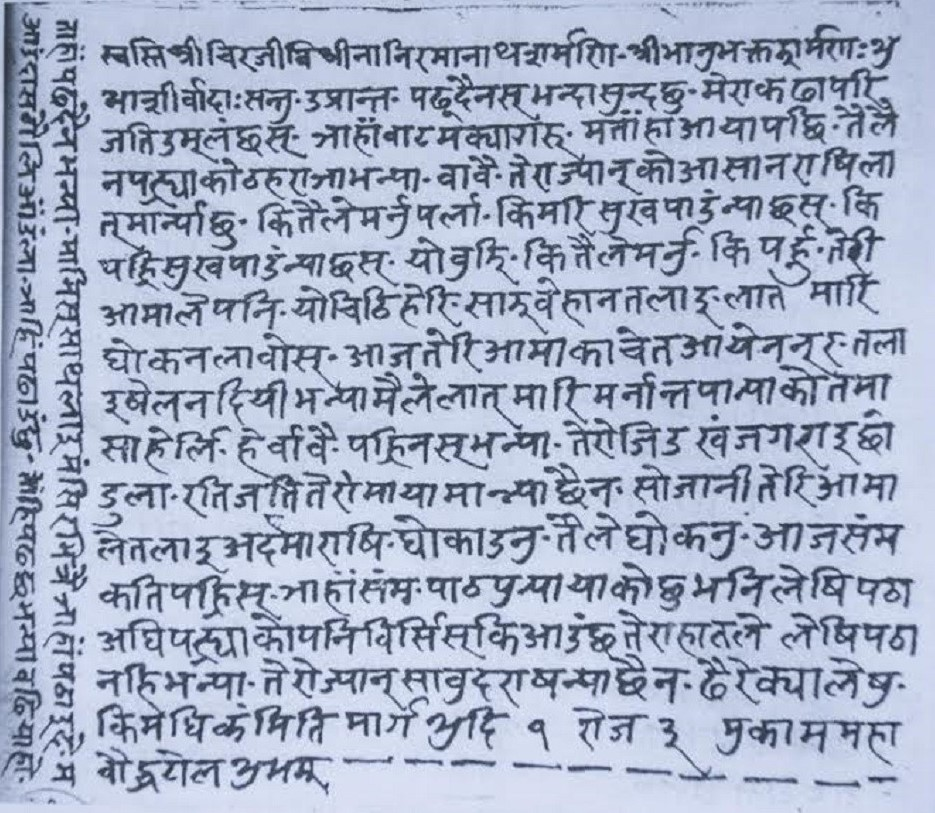
Letter of Bhanubhakta Acharya to his son (1858)

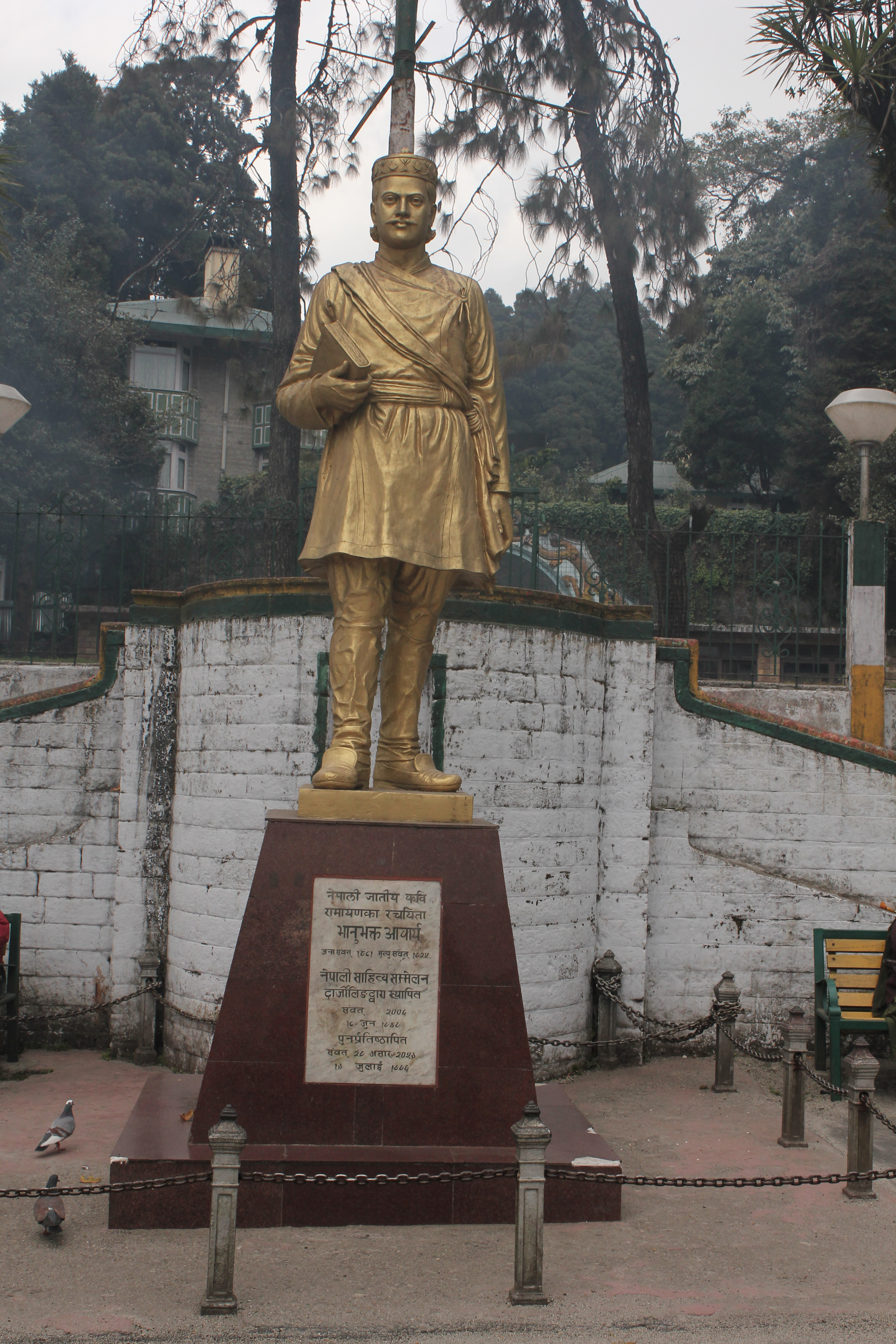
Statue of Bhanubhakta Acharya at Chowrasta, Darjeeling

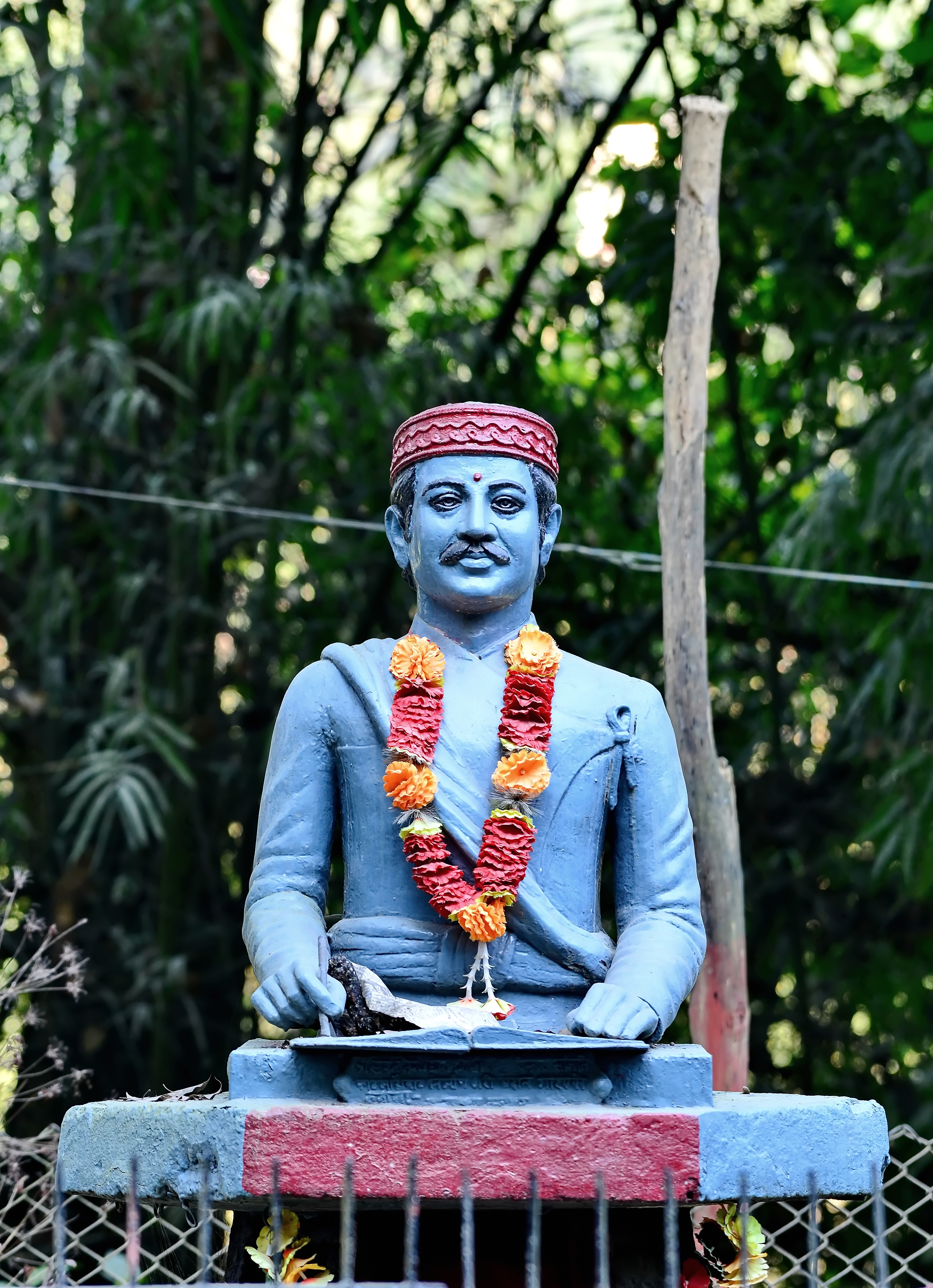
Bust of Bhanubhakta at Bhanu Ghansi Memorial Park, Tanahun

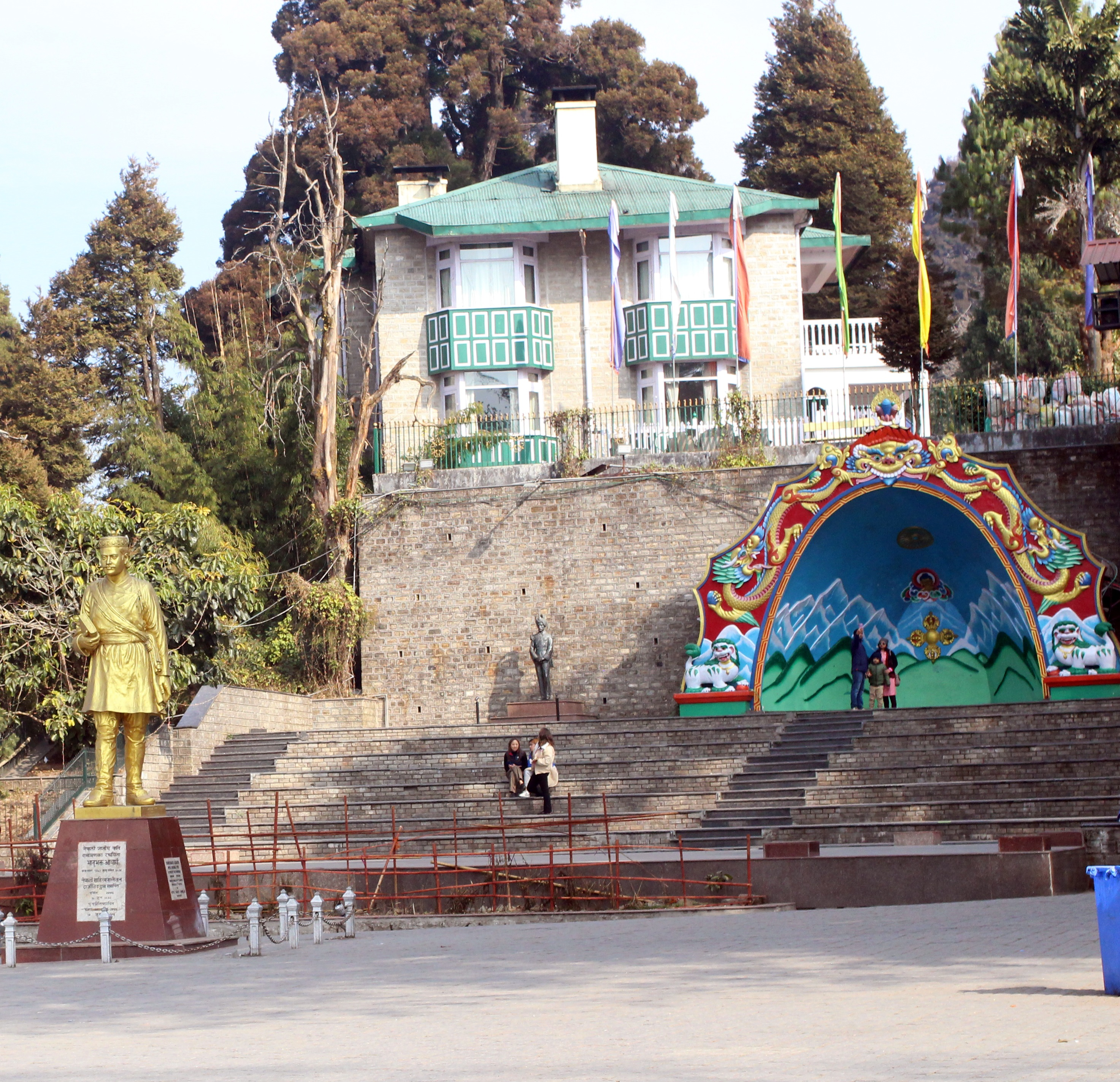
Bhanubhakta Acharya Statue at Chowrasta, Darjeeling

== See also ==
- Ghansi, who inspired Bhanubhakta Acharya to translate the Sanskrit epic Ramayana
- Shakti Ballav Aryal
- Bhanubhakta Acharya Highway
