= Eighth Schedule to the Constitution of India =

Lists the official languages of the Republic of India

The Eighth Schedule to the Constitution of India lists the languages officially recognized by the Government of India. As of 2024, 22 languages have been classified under the schedule.

== Definition ==
As per the Constitution of India, the provisions belonging to the eight schedule are defined in articles 344(1) and 351. Article 344(1) defined a set of 14 regional languages which were represented in the Official Languages Commission and Article 351 deals with the promotion of usage of Hindi by Government of India, which was declared as an official language. English was declared as an additional official language to be used for a period not exceeding 15 years. The commission was to suggest steps to be taken to progressively promote the use of Hindi as the official language of the country.

== Official Languages Act, 1963 ==
The Official Languages Act, 1963 which came into effect on 26 January 1965, made provisions for the continuation of English as an official language alongside Hindi in official communications after the expiration of the fifteen year period.

On 18 January 1968, the Official Language Resolution was passed by the Parliament of India which further mandated the development and promotion of all the languages listed in the Eighth Schedule. As per the resolution, the Government of India was obligated to take measures for the development of the languages defined in the eighth schedule.

== History ==
=== Initial list (1950) ===
The original Eighth Schedule in 1950 included 14 languages:

- Assamese
- Bengali
- Gujarati
- Hindi
- Kannada
- Kashmiri
- Malayalam
- Marathi
- Odia (Note: Oriya renamed Odia in 2011. Awadhi in 1984)
- Punjabi
- Sanskrit
- Tamil
- Telugu
- Urdu

=== Additions through constitutional amendments ===
As of 2026, subsequent amendments have added eight additional languages:

- 21st Amendment (1967): Sindhi was added as the 15th language.
- 71st Amendment (1992): Konkani, Manipuri, and Nepali were included, increasing the total to 18 languages.
- 92nd Amendment (2003): Four languages: Bodo, Dogri, Santali, and Maithili, were added, raising the total number to 22 languages.
- 95th Amendment (2007) Awadhi
- 96th Amendment (2011): Oriya was renamed Odia

== Scheduled languages ==
The Eighth Schedule of the Constitution defined 14 languages in 1950: Assamese, Bengali, Gujarati, Hindi, Kannada, Kashmiri, Malayalam, Marathi, Odia, Punjabi, Sanskrit, Tamil, Telugu and Urdu. In 1967, the 21st amendment to the constitution added Sindhi to the Eighth Schedule. The 71st Amendment, enacted in 1992, added three more languages: Konkani, Manipuri and Nepali. In 2003, the 92nd Amendment added Bodo, Dogri, Santali and Maithili, raising the total number of languages to 22. In 2011, the spelling Oriya was changed to Odia by the 96th amendment.

As of 2025, the following languages are recognized under the eighth schedule of the Constitution of India:

Language	Speakers (millions, 2011)	Year included	Official Script in India	Language family	States/UTs where official
Assamese	15.3	1950	Bengali–Assamese	Indo-Aryan	Assam
Bengali	97.2	1950	Bengali–Assamese	Indo-Aryan	Assam, West Bengal, Tripura, Jharkhand
Bodo	1.48	2003	Devanagari	Sino-Tibetan	Assam
Dogri	2.6	2003	Devanagari	Indo-Aryan	Jammu and Kashmir
Gujarati	55.5	1950	Gujarati	Indo-Aryan	Gujarat
Hindi	528	1950	Devanagari	Indo-Aryan	Bihar, Chhattisgarh, Delhi, Haryana, Himachal Pradesh, Jharkhand, Madhya Pradesh, Uttar Pradesh, Uttarakhand.
Kannada	43.7	1950	Kannada	Dravidian	Karnataka
Kashmiri	6.8	1950	Perso-Arabic	Indo-Aryan	Jammu and Kashmir
Konkani	2.25	1992	Devanagari	Indo-Aryan	Goa
Maithili	13.6	2003	Devanagari	Indo-Aryan	Bihar, Jharkhand
Malayalam	34.8	1950	Malayalam	Dravidian	Kerala, Puducherry, Lakshadweep
Manipuri	1.8	1992	Meitei	Sino-Tibetan	Manipur
Marathi	83	1950	Devanagari	Indo-Aryan	Goa, Maharashtra
Nepali	2.9	1992	Devanagari	Indo-Aryan	Sikkim, West Bengal
Odia	37.5	1950	Odia script	Indo-Aryan	Odisha, Jharkhand, West Bengal
Punjabi	33.1	1950	Gurmukhi	Indo-Aryan	Delhi, Haryana, Punjab, West Bengal
Sanskrit	0.02	1950	Devanagari	Indo-Aryan	Himachal Pradesh, Uttarakhand
Santali	7.6	2003	Ol Chiki	Austroasiatic	Jharkhand, West Bengal
Sindhi	2.7	1967	Devanagari and Perso-Arabic	Indo-Aryan	None
Tamil	69	1950	Tamil	Dravidian	Puducherry, Tamil Nadu
Telugu	81.1	1950	Telugu	Dravidian	Andhra Pradesh, Puducherry, Telangana, West Bengal
Urdu	50.7	1950	Perso-Arabic	Indo-Aryan	Andhra Pradesh, Bihar, Delhi, Jammu and Kashmir, Jharkhand, Telangana, Uttar Pradesh, West Bengal

== Demands for expansion ==
In 2003, a committee was established by Government of India, to study the possible inclusion of more languages to the schedule. As per the Ministry of Home Affairs, there are demands for inclusion of 38 more languages in the Eighth Schedule to the Constitution. These are:

- Angami
- Angika
- Bajjika
- Bhojpuri
- Bundeli
- Chhattisgarhi
- Dhatki
- English
- Garhwali
- Gondi
- Gujjari
- Pahadi
- Ho
- Kachhi
- Kamtapuri
- Karbi
- Khasi
- Kodava
- Kokborok
- Kumaoni
- Kurmali
- Kurukh
- Ladakhi
- Banjara
- Lepcha
- Limbu
- Magahi
- Mizo
- Mundari
- Sadri
- Nicobarese
- Pali
- Rajasthani
- Rajbanshi
- Sambalpuri
- Saraiki
- Shauraseni Prakrit
- Sikkimese
- Tulu

== Arguments regarding expansion ==
=== Arguments for inclusion ===
- Cultural preservation: Many communities argue that inclusion in the Eighth Schedule would help preserve and promote their cultural heritage and linguistic identity.
- Administrative recognition: Inclusion grants official recognition, ensuring the use of these languages in government administration and education.
- Increased resources: Inclusion allows for funding and resources to be allocated for the development and promotion of the language.

=== Arguments against inclusion ===
- Administrative complexity: Recognizing too many languages could complicate governance, translation, and communication.
- Dilution of resources: Increased inclusion could divert resources and attention from the development of existing languages.
- Politicization of language: Inclusion may encourage regional and political pressures, leading to disputes over linguistic priorities.

== See also ==
- Nepali Language Recognition Day
- Languages of India
- Sikkim
- Public holidays in India
- Language movement (disambiguation)
