= Nepali Sahitya Parishad Sikkim =

Nepali language organization in Sikkim

Nepali Sahitya Parishad, Sikkim
- Formation: 1981
- Headquarters: Gangtok, India
- Location: Jeewan Theeng Marg, Development Area, Gangtok, Sikkim 737101
- President: Hari Dhungyal
- General Secretary: Neelam Neopany
- Treasurer: G.S Subba
- Office Secretary: Chandra Dulal
- Website: www.sahityaparishadsikkim.com

Nepali Sahitya Parishad (Nepali:नेपाली साहित्य परिषद सिक्किम) is a Literary organisation of Nepali language and literature in Sikkim which was established in the year 1981. The organisation mainly engaged in publication and promotion of literary dialogue and ceaselessly endeavored in promoting good taste and healthy reading habits to the like minded people, and groups through seminars, lectures, symposia, discussions, readings and performances, to increase the pace of mutual translations through workshops and individual assignments and to develop a serious literary culture through the publications of journals, monographs, individual creative works of every genre, anthologies, encyclopedias, dictionaries, bibliographies, who's who of writers and histories of literature. The head office of same is located at Jeewan Theeng Marg, Development Area, Gangtok, Sikkim 737101.

== See also ==
- Manipuri Sahitya Parishad
- Sahitya Akademi
