= Rajasthani language movement =

The Rajasthani language movement has been campaigning for greater recognition for the Rajasthani language since 1947.
