= Nepali Language Recognition Day =

Annual event dedicated to Nepali language

- Observed by: Indian Gorkha
- Type: Worldwide
- Significance: Commemorating the constitutional recognition of Nepali language in Indian
- Date: August 20
- Frequency: Annual

Nepali Language Recognition Day (Nepali: नेपाली भाषा मान्यता दिवस) is celebrated on August 20 to commemorate the day when the Nepali language was officially recognized in the Indian Constitution. This happened on August 20, 1992, when the language was added to the Eighth Schedule to the Constitution of India. The day is celebrated by Nepali speakers across India as a mark of respect for their language.

The recognition of the Nepali language was ignited as a proposal during India’s Independence in 1947. Anand Singh Thapa began the movement in 1956.

== See also ==
- Languages of India
- Sikkim
- Public holidays in India
