= Meitei language movement =

Linguistic movement

"Meitei Lon" (literally meaning "Meitei language"), written in Meitei script

The Meitei language movement (Meitei: Meitei Longi Kongjang), also known as the Manipuri language movement (Meitei: Manipuri Longi Kongjang), is any linguistic movement undertaken by the literary, political and social associations as well as organisations, advocating for a change or development of Meitei language (officially known as Manipuri language) in various critical, discriminative and unfavorable circumstances and situations.

In the history of Meitei language, there were 4 notable linguistic movements that took place.

== Scheduled language movement ==
With the introduction of 14 Indian languages in an officially recognized category named "scheduled languages" by the Government of India in the year 1950, in which Meitei language was not included, there was a language movement advocated by the literary, political and social associations as well as organizations, from Northeast India (especially from Manipur, Assam and Tripura), spearheaded especially by the Manipuri Sahitya Parishad and the "All Manipur Students' Union" (AMSU), demanding the "scheduled language" status for Meitei language (officially called Manipuri language) for more than four long decades. In the year 1992, Meitei language (officially called Manipuri language) was given the "scheduled language" status with the "71st Constitutional Amendment Act" of the Indian Constitution. The day of the inclusion of Meitei language in the Eighth Schedule to the Constitution of India and making it one of the official languages of the Indian Republic is annually commemorated as Meitei Language Day (also called Manipuri Language Day) on August 20.

== Classical language movement ==
With the introduction of an officially recognised linguistic elite category called "Classical Languages of India" by the Government of India, the social movement of Meitei language to achieve the classical language status is advocated by various literary, political, social associations and organisations as well as notable individual personalities of Bangladesh, Myanmar, Northeast India (prominently Assam, Manipur and Tripura).

== Associate official language movement ==
Due to the exemption of all the candidates who do not appear the exams in either of the three mandatory languages, Assamese, Bodo or Bengali, without provisions of any alternative language, in job recruitments conducted by the Assam Public Service Commission (APSC) of the Government of Assam (in accordance to the "Assam Public Services Competitive Examination (Amendment) Rules, 2019"), the social movement of Meitei language to be included as an associate official language of the Government of Assam was advocated by several literary, political, social associations and organisations as well as by various leaders of Northeast India (predominantly from Assam, Manipur and Tripura).

== See also ==
- Language revitalization
- Meitei nationalism
