= Chundi Ramgha =

Village in Tanahun District, Nepal

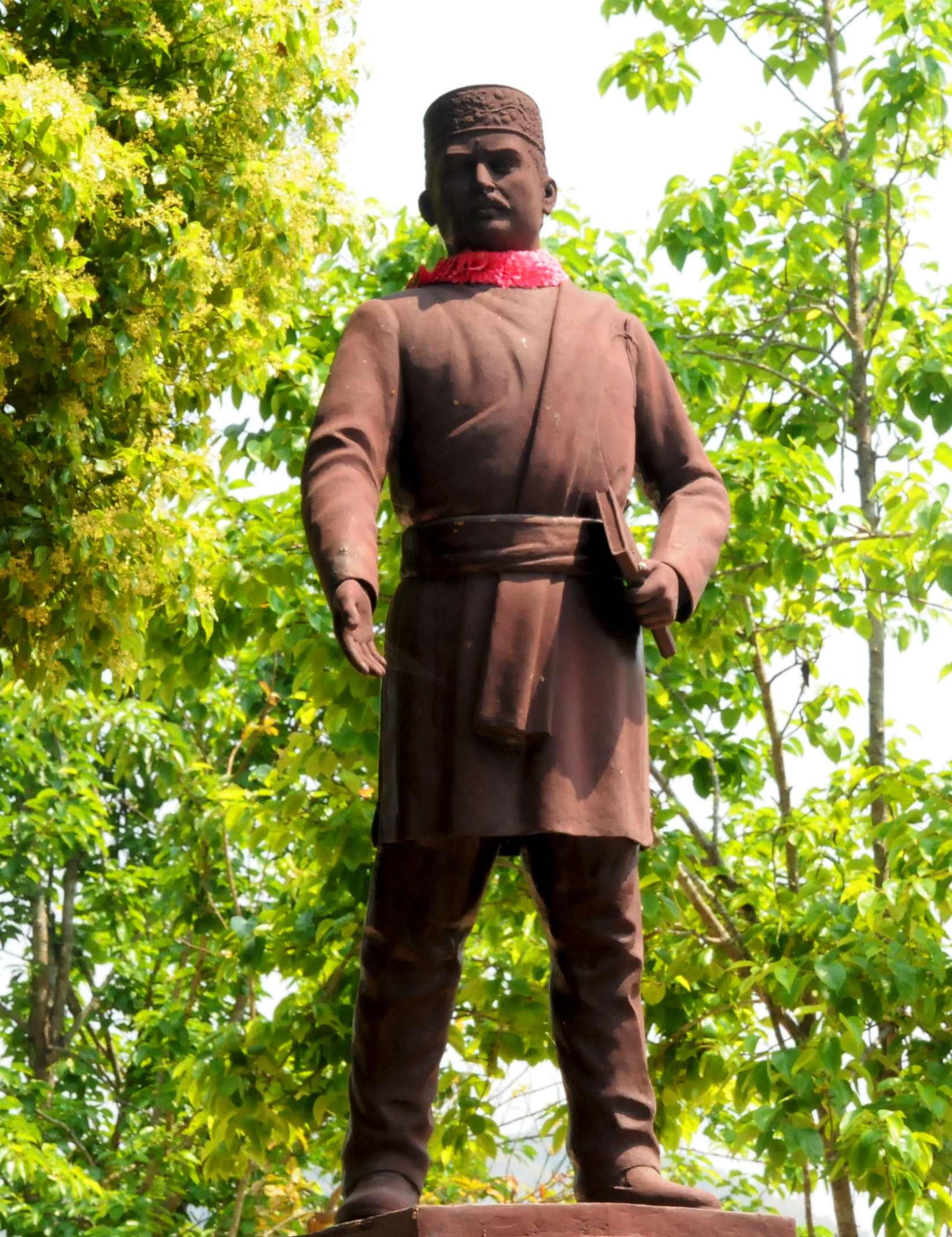
A Statue of Bhanubhakta Acharya at his birthplace Chundi Ramgha, Tanahun District Nepal

Chundi Ramgha is a village which lies in Bhanu Municipality, Tanahun District, Nepal. Chundi is the name of river (Chundi River), which flows through the lower lands of Ramgha base.

The first poet of Nepali language hence known as Aadikavi (early poet) Bhanubhakta Acharya was born in Chundi Ramgha. Nara Nath Acharya, who wrote the Authentic Biography of Bhanubhakta Acharya was also born and lived in this village.
