= Assam Public Service Commission =

State recruitment agency

- APSC

Commission overview
- Formed: 1 April 1937
- Preceding agencies: State Public Service Commission; Public Service Commission
- Jurisdiction: State of Assam
- Headquarters: APSC Building, Jawahar Nagar, Khanapara, Guwahati 781022
- Commission executives: Shri Debaraj Upadhaya, IPS(Retd), Chairman; Maj Gen Bhaskar Kalita YSM (Retd), Member; Shri Bhaskar Phukan, IAS (Retd.), Member; Shri Mrigesh Narayan Barua, ACS (Retd.), Member; Smti Prabhati Thaosen, IAS (Retd.), Member; Shri Pabitra Ram Khaund, IAS (Retd.), Member; Smti Chandana Mahanta, ACS, Secretary; Shri Chinmoy Nath, ACS, Principal Controller Of Examination
- Parent department: Government of Assam
- Website: apsc.nic.in

The Assam Public Service Commission (APSC) is a government body of the state of Assam, India, for recruitment of candidates through competitive examinations for various government jobs under the Government of Assam, including government departments, organizations, state public sector undertakings, and autonomous bodies. It is headquartered at Jawahar Nagar, Khanapara in Guwahati and functions through its own secretariat. It was established on 1 April 1937.

The primary mandate of the Assam Public Service Commission is to conduct competitive examinations, interviews, and assessments to select candidates for various government jobs within the state. These positions range from administrative and police services to finance, education, and other key sectors, each contributing to the governance and development of Assam. As of January 2025, Shri Debaraj Upadhaya, IPS (Retd.) is the commission Chairman.

A former chairperson of the Assam Public Service Commission and 29 agricultural development officers appointed during his stint were convicted by a special court in a 2014 cash-for-job scam, that was under investigation for eight years.

== List of chairpersons ==
Number	Name	From	To
1	J. Hazlett, ICS	1937–38	1939–40
2	E.P. Burke, ICS	1940–41	1942–43
3	J.C. Higgins, ICS	1943–44	1944–45
4	A.J. Dash, ICS	1945	1946
5	K. Cantllie, ICS	1946–47	1947–48
6	Kameswar Das, ICS	1948–49	1952–53
7	J.P. Chaliha	1953–54	1956–57
8	S.J. Duncan, IAS	1957	1958
9	A.N. Bhattacharjee, IAS	1958–59	1962–63
10	B. Khongmen	1963	1964
11	H.C. Bhuyan	1964	1965
12	S. Barkataki, IAS	1965–66	1968–69
13	R. Thanhlira	1968–69	1974–75
14	R.M. Das	1975	1976
15	R.N. Basumatary	1976–77	1977–78
16	R.K. Bhuyan	1978–79	1979–80
17	A.K.Choudhury, IAS	1 August 1979	1 March 1984
18	Arif Ali, IAS	1 March 1984	30 July 1989
19	Dwijendra Nath Barua, IAS	1 August 1989	22 April 1993
20	T.K. Bora, IAS	22 April 1993	1 August 1994
21	T.P. Das	1 August 1994 8 February 1995	7 February 1995 31 July 2000
22	Debi Charan Bora	1 August 2000	28 February 2001
23	Amiya Kr. Bora	28 February 2001	27 February 2007
24	Geeta Basumatari	28 February 2007	3 January 2012
25	R. Borthakur	1 December 2016	11 April 2017
26	Anupam Kr. Roy, IAS	11 April 2017	28 February 2018
27	Dhrubajyoti Hazarika, IAS	28 February 2018	31 July 2018
28	Dipak Kr. Sarma, IAS	31 July 2018	29 December 2019
29	Rakesh Kr. Paul	3 January 2012 11 December 2013	11 December 2013 10 December 2019
30	Pallab Bhattacharya, IPS	9 February 2020	16 January 2021
31	Rajiv Kumar Bora, IAS	10 February 2021	7 June 2022
32	Ajanta Nath	27 June 2022	4 September 2022
33	Bharat Bhushan Dev Choudhury, IAS	5 September 2022	1 January 2025
34	Debaraj Upadhaya, IPS	13 January 2025	Present

== See also ==
- List of Public service commissions in India
