= Nepali language =

Indo-Aryan Language

Nepali
- नेपाली
- The word "Nepali" in Devanagari script
- Pronunciation: [/nɛˈpɑːli/]
- Native to: Nepal (official); Sinja Valley
- Region: Himalayas (Note: Historically spoken just by the Karnali Khas people, now spoken as the lingua franca in Nepal.)
- Ethnicity: Khas
- Speakers: L1: 19 million (2011–2021); L2: 14 million (2021 census); Total: 32 million
- Language family: Indo-European: Indo-Iranian; Indo-Aryan; Northern Zone; Eastern Pahari; Nepali
- Early forms: Proto-Indo-European: Proto-Indo-Iranian; Proto-Indo-Aryan; Vedic Sanskrit; Classical Sanskrit; Prakrit; Apabhraṃśa; Khasa Prakrit
- Writing system: Devanagari; Devanagari Braille; Ranjana Script
- Signed forms: Signed Nepali

Official status
- Official language in: Nepal; India; Sikkim (working; official); West Bengal (additional); Gorkhaland Territorial Administration (official)
- Recognised minority language in: Bhutan; Myanmar
- Regulated by: Nepal Academy

Language codes
- ISO 639-1: ne
- ISO 639-2: nep
- ISO 639-3: nep – inclusive code Individual code: npi – Nepali
- Glottolog: nepa1254
- Linguasphere: 59-AAF-d
- Map showing distribution of Nepali speakers in South Asia. Dark red is areas with a Nepali-speaking majority or plurality, light red is where Nepali speakers are more than 20% of the population

Nepali (Devanagari: नेपाली) is an Indo-Aryan language, belonging to the Indo-Iranian branch within the Indo-European language family, native to the Himalayan region of South Asia. Nepali is commonly classified within the Eastern Pahari group of the Northern zone of Indo-Aryan. It is the official and most-widely spoken language of Nepal, where it also serves as a lingua franca. Nepali has official status in the Indian constitution alongside having official status in the Indian states of Sikkim and West Bengal, in the latter's semi-autonomous Gorkhaland region, being a majority language in both of these places.

It is also spoken by about a quarter of Bhutan. Nepali also has a significant number of speakers in the Indian states of Arunachal Pradesh, Assam, Himachal Pradesh, Manipur, Meghalaya, Mizoram and Uttarakhand. In Myanmar, it is spoken by the Burmese Gurkhas community. The Nepali diaspora in the Middle East, Brunei, Australia and around the world also use the language. Overall, Nepali is spoken by approximately 19 million native speakers and additional 14 million as a second language.

The language originated in the Sinja Valley, which served as the capital of the Khasa Kingdom around the 10th and 14th centuries. It developed in close contact with several Indo-Aryan languages, particularly other Pahari languages. Nepali was originally spoken by the Khas people, an Indo-Aryan ethno-linguistic group.

The earliest known inscription in the Nepali language is believed to be an inscription in Dullu, located in Dailekh District, which was written around the reign of King Bhupal Damupal, around the 981 CE. The institutionalisation of the Nepali language began during the rule of the Kingdom of Gorkha in the 16th century, which later became known as the Kingdom of Nepal. The various different dialects of Nepali language are believed to emerged across the Khasa Kingdom, present-day Western Nepal, parts of Uttarakhand, India, and parts of Tibet which later expanded into the Gandaki basin, shaped by influences from Sanskrit, and local Tibeto-Burman languages helping Nepali language develop into a lingua franca.

Like all other modern Indo-Aryan languages, Nepali grammar has undergone significant syncretisation and has lost much of the complex declensional system found in older forms of the language. Nepali developed a significant literature during the 19th century. Around 1830, several Nepali poets wrote on themes from the Sanskrit epics Ramayana and the Bhagavata Purana, which was followed by Bhanubhakta Acharya translating the Ramayana into Nepali, which received a great popularity for the colloquial flavour of its language, religious sincerity, and realistic natural descriptions.

== Etymology ==
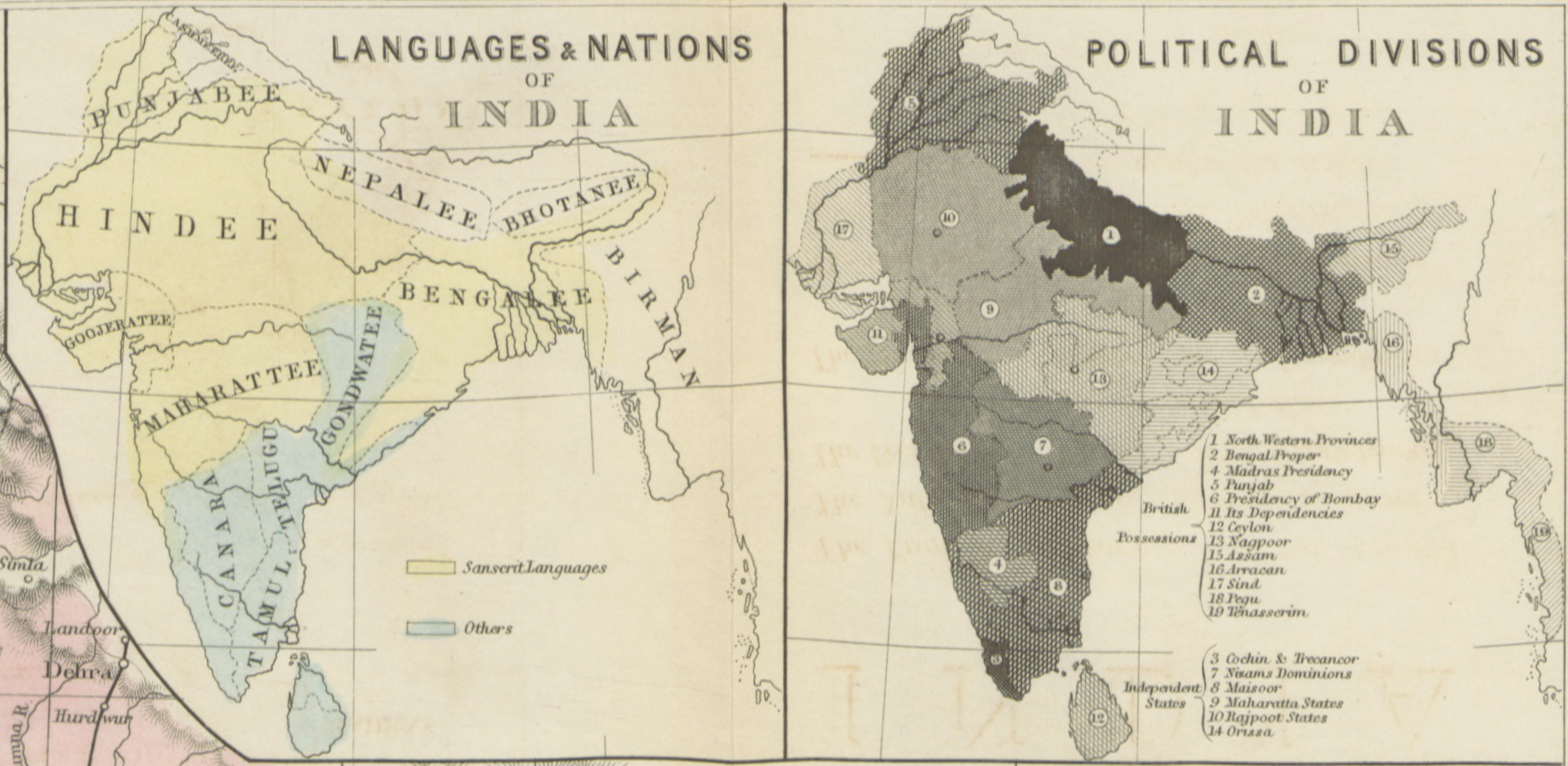
A map showing languages of the Indian subcontinent c. 1858; It refers to the language as "Nepalee".

The term Nepali derived from Nepal was officially adopted by the Government of Nepal in 1933, when Gorkha Bhasa Prakashini Samiti (Gorkha Language Publishing Committee), a government institution established in 1913 (B.S. 1970) for advancement of Gorkha Bhasa, renamed itself as Nepali Bhasa Prakashini Samiti (Nepali Language Publishing Committee) in 1933 (B.S. 1990), which is currently known as Sajha Prakashan. Conversely, the term Gorkhali in the former national anthem entitled "Shriman Gambhir" was changed to Nepali in 1951. However, the term Nepali was used before the official adoption notably by Jaya Prithvi Bahadur Singh, now considered one of the national heroes of Nepal, who advocated for embracing the term.

The initial name of Nepali language was "Khas Kura" (खस कुरा), meaning language or speech of the Khas people, as the language developed during the rule of the Khasa Kingdom in the western Nepal. Following the Unification of Nepal led by Shah dynasty's Prithvi Narayan Shah, Nepali language became known as Gorakhā Bhāṣā (गोरखा भाषा; language of the Gorkhas) as it was spoken by Gorkhas. The people living in the Pahad or the hilly region, where it does not generally contain snow, called the language Parvate Kurā (पर्वते कुरा), meaning "the speech of the hills".

== History ==
=== Origin and development ===
A simplified overview of the Indo-Aryan language family.

Early forms of present-day Nepali developed from the Middle Indo-Aryan apabhraṃśa vernaculars of present-day western Nepal in the 10th–14th centuries, during the times of the Khasa Kingdom. The language evolved from Sanskrit, Prakrit, and Apabhraṃśa. Following the decline of the Khasa Kingdom, it was divided into Baise Rajya (22 principalities) in Karnali-Bheri region and Chaubise rajya (24 principalities) in Gandaki region. The currently popular variant of Nepali is believed to have originated around 500 years ago with the mass migration of a branch of Khas people from the Karnali-Bheri-Seti eastward to settle in lower valleys of the Karnali and the Gandaki basin.

During the times of Sena dynasty, who ruled a vast area in Terai and central hills of Nepal, Nepali language became influenced by the Indian languages including Awadhi, Bhojpuri, Braj Bhasha and Maithili. Nepali speakers and Senas had a close connect, subsequently, the language became the lingua franca in the area. As a result, the grammar became simplified, vocabulary was expanded, and its phonology was softened, after it was syncretised, Nepali lost much of the complex declensional system present in the older languages. In the Kathmandu Valley (then known as Nepal Mandala), Nepali language inscriptions can be seen during the reigns of Lakshmi Narasimha Malla and Pratap Malla, which indicates the significant increment of Nepali speakers in Kathmandu Valley. It was during this period of growth that Nepali borrowed many words from various Sino-Tibetan languages, primarily Newar. This is evident from the fact that the borrowed words match the older form of the languages in question.

=== Middle Nepali ===
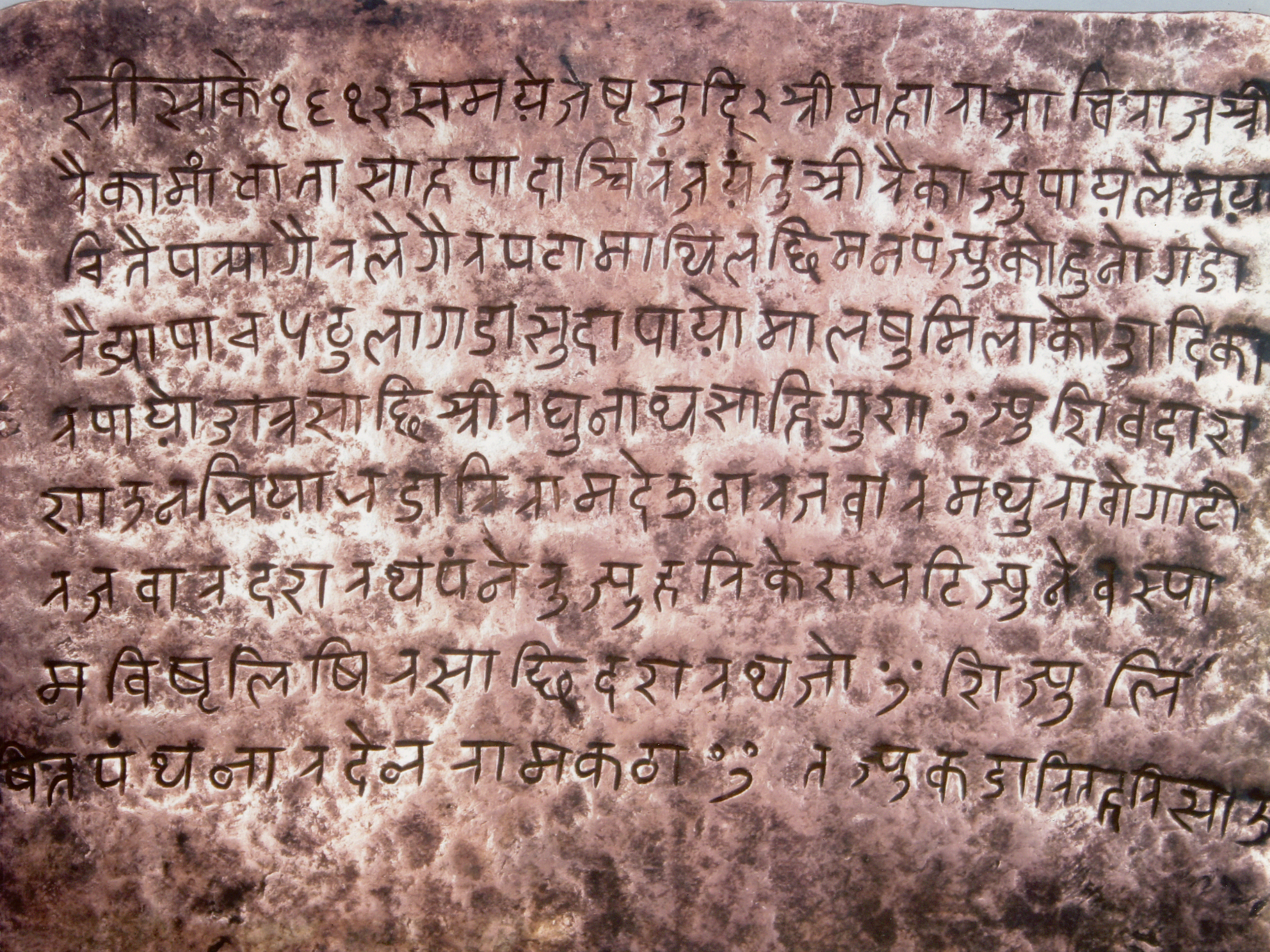
Copper inscription by King of Doti, Raika Mandhata Shahi, from the Saka Era 1612 (1747 BS) in old Nepali language using Devanagari-like script

The institutionalisation of the Nepali language is believed to have started with the Shah kings of Gorkha Kingdom, in the modern day Gorkha District of Nepal. Following the Unification of Nepal, the language moved to the court of the Kingdom of Nepal in the 18th century, where it became the state language. One of the earliest works in the Middle Nepali was written during the reign of Ram Shah, King of Gorkha, a book by unknown writer called Ram Shah ko Jivani (A Biography of Ram Shah). Prithvi Narayan Shah's Divyopadesh, written toward the end of his life, around 1774–75, contains old Nepali dialect of the era, is considered as the first work of essay of Nepali literature.

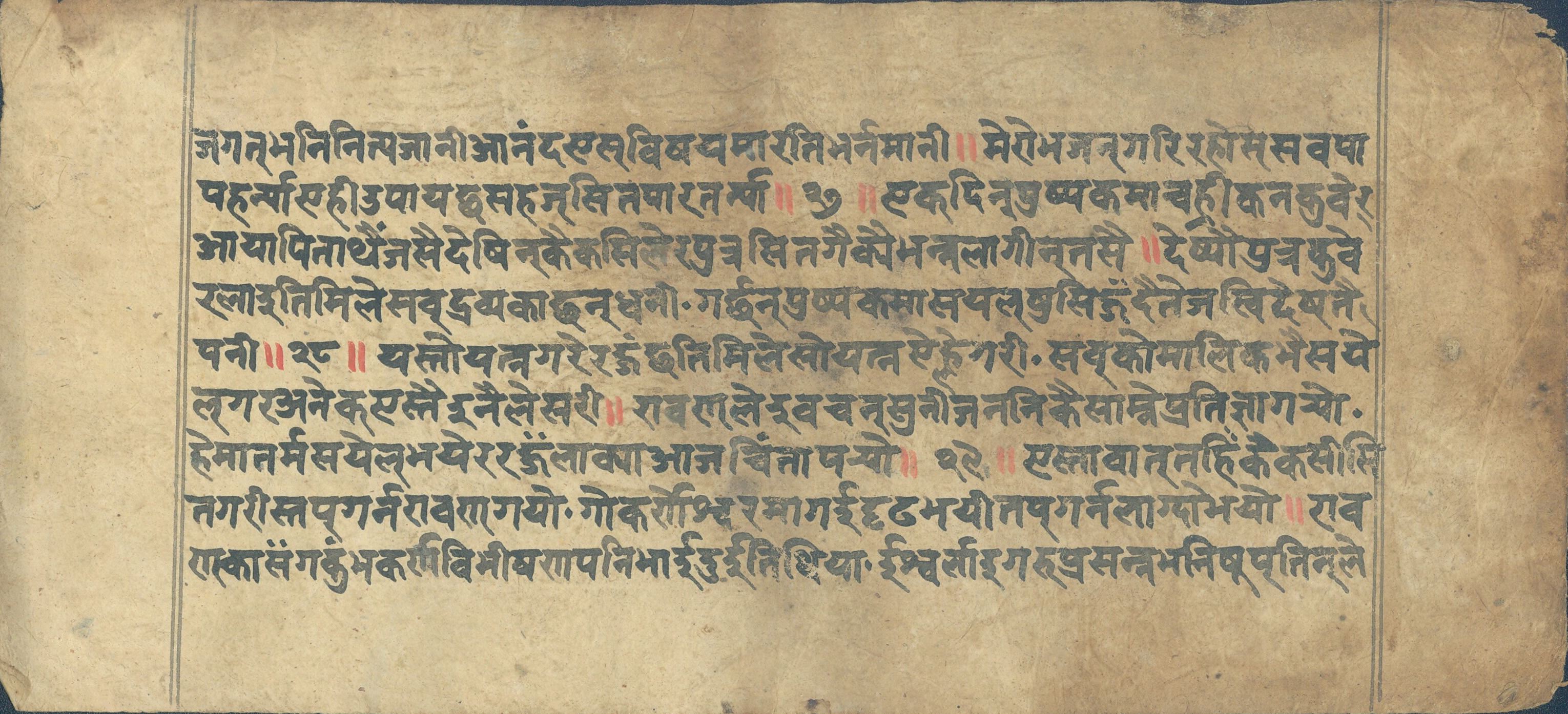
Manuscript of Bhanubhakta Acharya's Bhanubhakta Ramayana

During this time Nepali developed a standardised prose in the Lal mohar (royal charter)—documents related to the Nepalese Kingdom dealing with diplomatic writings, tax, and administrative records. The language of the Lal mohar is nearly modern with some minor differences in grammar and with a pre-modern orthography. Few changes including changing Kari (करि) to Gari (गरि) and merging Hunu (हुनु) with cha (छ) to create huncha (हुन्छ) were done. The most prominent work written during this time was Bhanubhakta Acharya's Bhanubhakta Ramayana, a translation of the epic Ramayana from Sanskrit to Nepali for the first time. Acharya's work has been described by some as leading to the "cultural, emotional and linguistic unification" of Nepal, compared to Prithvi Narayan Shah's political unification of Nepal.

=== Modern Nepali ===
The modern period of Nepali begins in the early 20th century. During this time the ruling Rana dynasty made various attempts to make Nepali the language of education, notably by Dev Shumsher and Chandra Shumsher Jung Bahadur Rana, who established Gorkhapatra and the Gorkha Bhasa Prakashini Samiti, respectively. At this time, when Nepali had a limited literature compared to the Hindi and Bengali languages, a movement notably in Varanasi, and Darjeeling was started to create uniformed Nepali identity, which was later adopted in Nepal following the 1951 Nepalese revolution and during the Panchayat system. In 1957, Royal Nepal Academy was established with the objectives of developing and promoting Nepali literature, culture, art and science. During Panchayat, Nepal adopted a "One King, One Dress, One Language, One Nation" ideology, which promoted Nepali language as basis for Nepali nationalism. This time is considered to be a golden age for the language.

In West Bengal, Nepali language was recognised by West Bengal Government in 1961 as the official language for the Darjeeling district, and Kalimpong and Kurseong. In 1977, Nepali was officially accepted by Sahitya Academy, an organisation dedicated to the promotion of Indian literature. The Sikkim Official Languages Act, 1977, made Nepali as one of the official languages of Sikkim.

The Nepali language movement took place in India around the 1980s to include Nepali language in the Eighth Schedule to the Constitution of India through the Seventy-first Amendment of the Constitution of India. On 20 August 1992, the Lok Sabha passed a motion to add the Nepali language to the Eighth Schedule.

== Official status ==
=== Nepal ===
Nepali is the official language of Nepal and is spoken as a first language by majority of the country's population. It serves as the primary language of government, education, administration, and interethnic communication. Nepali is written in the Devanagari script, which is mandated by the Constitution of Nepal as the nation's official script.

=== India ===
Nepali is spoken as a first language in the Indian Himalayan region and its foothills, primarily by Indian Gorkhas. On 31 August 1992, Nepali was included in the Eight Schedule of the Constitution of India, granting it scheduled-language status, as a result of the Nepali language movement. This day is now celebrated annually as the Nepali Language Recognition Day. Nepali is also the official language of Sikkim and the Gorkhaland Territorial Administration, an autonomous administrative body in West Bengal.

=== Bhutan ===
Nepali is spoken as a first language by approximately 242,000 to 275,000 people in Bhutan, primarily by Bhutanese citizens of Nepali ethnicity known as the Lhotshampa. Despite being spoken as first language by a quarter of the population, Nepali has no official status in Bhutan.

=== Myanmar ===
Nepali is spoken as a first language by approximately 300,000 to 500,000 people in Myanmar, primarily by descendants of Gurkha soldiers who settled in the country following the Burma Campaign of World War II. After Myanmar gained independence, many Gurkhas joined the Burmese Army and participated in campaigns against ethnic insurgents and Kuomintang invasions during the 1950s. Many have also fought alongside armed groups such as the Kachin Independence Army. Nepalese in Myanmar have distinguished themselves in various fields, including Suk Bahadur Rai, recipient of the Aung San Thuriya Medal, the highest and most prestigious award in Myanmar. Suk Bahadur Thapa, a Gurkha soldier, multi-sport athlete,national 100-metre sprint record holder, former captain of the Myanmar national football team and considered the greatest footballer of Myanmar. Nandu Gyawali, a human rights activist featured on 100 Women (BBC) list, among numerous others. Despite a major influence in the country, Nepali has no official status in Myanmar.

== Geographic distribution ==
=== Nepal ===
According to the 2011 national census, 44.6% of the population of Nepal speaks Nepali as its first language. and 32.8% speak Nepali as a second language. Ethnologue reports 12,300,000 speakers within Nepal (from the 2011 census). It is spoken by 20,250,952, about 77.20% of the population, as their first language and second language.

=== India ===
Total number of Nepali speakers in India by state (2011 census)
1. West Bengal (36.0%)
2. Assam (20.0%)
3. Sikkim (12.0%)
4. Rest of Northeast India (8.00%)
5. Uttar Pradesh and Uttarakhand (12.0%)
6. Other states (12.0%)

According to the 2011 census of India, there were a total of 2,926,168 Nepali language speakers in India.

Nepali speakers in India by state
State	Nepali speakers (2011 census)
India	2,926,168
West Bengal	1,155,375
Assam	596,210
Sikkim	382,200
Uttarakhand	106,399
Arunachal Pradesh	95,317
Himachal Pradesh	89,508
Maharashtra	75,683
Manipur	63,756
Meghalaya	54,716
Nagaland	43,481
Delhi	37,468
Gujarat	25,142
Jammu and Kashmir	22,138
Punjab	22,061
Haryana	19,914
Karnataka	19,274
Uttar Pradesh	18,743
Jharkhand	16,956
Andhra Pradesh	11,551
Mizoram	8,994
Madhya Pradesh	8,724
Odisha	8,654
Rajasthan	7,636
Tamil Nadu	7,575
Chandigarh	6,546
Bihar	5,727
Kerala	3,665
Chhattisgarh	3,431
Tripura	2,787
Goa	2,600
Daman and Diu	1,401
Dadra and Nagar Haveli	1,152
Andaman and Nicobar Islands	949
Puducherry	431
Lakshadweep	4

=== Bhutan ===
In Bhutan, native Nepali speakers, known as Lhotshampa, are estimated at 35% of the population. Under pressure from ethnic cleansing, many Lhotshampa have left Bhutan and this number includes displaced Bhutanese refugees, with unofficial estimates of the ethnic Bhutanese refugee population as high as 30 to 40%, constituting a majority in the south (about 242,000 people).

=== Myanmar ===
Nepali speakers entered British Burma as Gurkha soldiers of the British Raj. While estimates vary, their population is said to range from 300,000 to 1 million. After Burma gained independence, many Gurkhas joined the Myanmar Army as soldiers, and are now occupied in a variety of professions.

=== Australia ===
Nepali is the third-most spoken language in the Australian state of Tasmania, where it is spoken by 1.3% of its population, and fifth-most spoken language in the Northern Territory, Australia, spoken by 1.3% of its population. Nepali is the most spoken language other than English in Rockdale and Kogarah. In Granville, Campsie and Ashfield it is the second most commonly spoken language other than English. Allawah and Hurstville have third most Nepali speaking population in New South Wales. There are regular Nepali language newspapers and magazines in Australia.

=== International ===
International geographic distribution
Country	Speaker population	Notes
Myanmar	300,000-500,000	
Australia	133,068	2021 census
Hong Kong	25,472	2016 census
Canada	13,375	2016 census
Finland	7,234	2023 statistics

== Phonology ==
Vowels and consonants are outlined in the tables below.

=== Vowels ===
Nepali vowel phonemes
	Front	Central	Back
Close	i ĩ		u ũ
Close-mid	e ẽ		o
Open-mid			ʌ ʌ̃
Open		a ã	

Nepali distinguishes six oral vowels and five nasal vowels. /o/ does not have a phonemic nasal counterpart, although it is often in free variation with [õ].

Nepali has ten diphthongs: /ui̯/, /iu̯/, /ei̯/, /eu̯/, /oi̯/, /ou̯/, /ʌi̯/, /ʌu̯/, /ai̯/, and /au̯/.

=== Consonants ===
Nepali consonant phonemes
			Bilabial	Dental	Alveolar	Retroflex	Palatal	Velar	Glottal
Nasal			m ⟨म⟩		n ⟨न/ञ⟩	(ɳ ⟨ण⟩)		ŋ ⟨ङ⟩	
Plosive/ Affricate	voiceless	unaspirated	p ⟨प⟩	t ⟨त⟩	t͡s ⟨च⟩	ʈ ⟨ट⟩		k ⟨क⟩	
Plosive/ Affricate	voiceless	aspirated	pʰ ⟨फ⟩	tʰ ⟨थ⟩	t͡sʰ ⟨छ⟩	ʈʰ ⟨ठ⟩		kʰ ⟨ख⟩	
Plosive/ Affricate	voiced	unaspirated	b ⟨ब⟩	d ⟨द⟩	d͡z ⟨ज⟩	ɖ ⟨ड⟩		ɡ ⟨ग⟩	
Plosive/ Affricate	voiced	aspirated	bʱ ⟨भ⟩	dʱ ⟨ध⟩	d͡zʱ ⟨झ⟩	ɖʱ ⟨ढ⟩		ɡʱ ⟨घ⟩	
Fricative					s ⟨श/ष/स⟩				ɦ ⟨ह⟩
Rhotic					r ⟨र⟩				
Approximant			(w ⟨व⟩)		l ⟨ल⟩		(j ⟨य⟩)		

[j] and [w] are nonsyllabic allophones of [i] and [u], respectively. Every consonant except [j], [w], and /ɦ/ has a geminate counterpart between vowels. /ɳ/ and /ʃ/ also exist in some loanwords such as /baɳ/ बाण "arrow" and /nareʃ/ नरेश "king", but these sounds are sometimes replaced with native Nepali phonemes. The murmured stops may lose their breathy-voice between vowels and word-finally. Non-geminate aspirated and murmured stops may also become fricatives, with /pʰ/ as [ɸ], /bʱ/ as [β], /kʰ/ as [x], and /ɡʱ/ as [ɣ]. Examples of this are /sʌpʰa/ 'clean' becoming [sʌɸa] and /ʌɡʱaɖi/ 'before' becoming [ʌɣaɽi].

Typically, sounds transcribed with the retroflex symbols ⟨ʈ, ʈʰ, ɖ, ɖʱ, ɽ, ɳ, ɽ̃⟩ are not purely retroflex [ʈ, ʈʰ, ɖ, ɖʱ, ɽ, ɳ, ɽ̃] but apical postalveolar [t̠, t̠ʰ, d̠, d̠ʱ, ɾ̠, n̠, ɾ̠̃]. Some speakers may use purely retroflex sounds after /u/ and /a/, but other speakers use the apical articulation in all positions.

Final schwas may or may not be preserved in speech. The following rules can be followed to figure out whether or not Nepali words retain the final schwa:

1. Schwa is retained if the final syllable is a conjunct consonant. अन्त (anta, 'end'), सम्बन्ध (sambandha, 'relation'), श्रेष्ठ (śreṣṭha, 'greatest'/a last name).
  Exceptions: conjuncts such as ञ्च ञ्ज in मञ्च (mañc, 'stage') गञ्ज (gañj, 'city') and occasionally the last name पन्त (panta/pant).
2. For any verb form the final schwa is always retained unless the schwa-cancelling halanta is present. हुन्छ (huncha, 'it happens'), भएर (bhaera, 'in happening so; therefore'), गएछ (gaecha, 'he apparently went'), but छन् (chan, 'they are'), गईन् (gain, 'she went'). Meanings may change with the wrong orthography: गईन (gaina, 'she didn't go') vs गईन् (gain, 'she went').
3. Adverbs, onomatopoeia and postpositions usually maintain the schwa and if they don't, a halanta is required: अब (aba 'now'), तिर (tira, 'towards'), आज (āja, 'today') सिम्सिम (simsim 'drizzle') vs झन् (jhan, 'more').
4. Few exceptional nouns retain the schwa such as: दु:ख (dukha, 'suffering'), सुख (sukha, 'pleasure').

Note: Schwas are often retained in music and poetry to add extra syllables when needed.

== Grammar ==
Nepali is a highly fusional language in verbal morphology, and is agglutinative in the case morphology with relatively free word order, although the dominant arrangement is SOV (subject–object–verb). There are three major levels or gradations of honorifics, as well as two more based on dialect and class: low, medium, high, very high, and royal. Low honorific is used where no respect is due, medium honorific is used to signify equal status or neutrality, and high honorific signifies respect. The very high grade is used by some speakers, and the highest level royal honorific, was used to refer to members of the royal family, and by the royals among themselves. Often it would also use unique or uncommon vocabulary.

Honorific Grade	Nepali	IAST Transliteration	English
Low	तँ खान्छस्	tã khānchas	You eat (food).
Medium	तिमी खान्छौ	timī khānchau	You eat (food).
High	तपाईं खानु हुन्छ	tapāīṃ khānu huncha	You eat (food).
Very high	हजुर खाइसिन्छ	hajura khāisincha	You eat (food).
Royal	मौसुफ खाइबक्सिन्छ	mausupha khāibaksincha	You eat (food).

Nepali makes frequent use of infixes to show verbal negation, which in turn are used as echo responses to yes-no questions.

== Writing system ==
Nepali is generally written in Devanagari script. In certain regions, the Tibetan script was also used in regions with predominantly Tibetic population, with common Tibetan expressions and pronunciation.

In the section below Nepali is represented in Latin transliteration using the IAST scheme and IPA. The chief features are: subscript dots for retroflex consonants; macrons for etymologically, contrastively long vowels; h denoting aspirated plosives. Tildes denote nasal vowels.

Consonants
क IPA: /kʌ/	ख IPA: /kʰʌ/, /xʌ/	ग IPA: /ɡʌ/	घ IPA: /ɡʱʌ/, /ɣʌ/	ङ IPA: /ŋʌ/	च IPA: /t͡sʌ/	छ IPA: /t͡sʰʌ/	ज IPA: /d͡zʌ/	झ IPA: /d͡zʱʌ/	ञ IPA: /nʌ/	ट IPA: /ʈʌ/
ठ IPA: /ʈʰʌ/	ड IPA: /ɖʌ/	ढ IPA: /ɖʱʌ/	ण IPA: /nʌ/, /ɳʌ/	त IPA: /tʌ/	थ IPA: /tʰʌ/	द IPA: /dʌ/	ध IPA: /dʱʌ/	न IPA: /nʌ/	प IPA: /pʌ/	फ IPA: /pʰʌ/, /ɸʌ/
ब IPA: /bʌ/	भ IPA: /bʱʌ/, /βʌ/	म IPA: /mʌ/	य IPA: /jʌ/	र IPA: /rʌ/	ल IPA: /lʌ/	व IPA: /wʌ/	श IPA: /sʌ/	ष IPA: /sʌ/, /kʰʌ/	स IPA: /sʌ/	ह IPA: /ɦʌ/

Ligatures
क + ष क्ष IPA: /t͡sʰjʌ/, /ksʌ/	त + र त्र IPA: /trʌ/	ज + ञ ज्ञ IPA: /ɡjʌ/

Diacritics combined with the letter ब
Vowels										Consonants			
अ a IPA: /ʌ/	आ ā IPA: /a/	इ i IPA: /i/	ई ī IPA: /i/	उ u IPA: /u/	ऊ ū IPA: /u/	ए e IPA: /e/	ऐ ai IPA: /i̯/	ओ o IPA: /o/	औ au IPA: /u̯/	ऋ ṛ IPA: /r̩/	अं ṃ IPA: /◌̃/	अः ḥ IPA: /ɦ/	अँ ã IPA: /ʌ̃/
	◌ा	◌ि	◌ी	◌ु	◌ू	◌े	◌ै	◌ो	◌ौ	◌ृ	◌ं	ः	◌ँ
ब ब	ब +◌ा बा	ब + ◌ि बि	ब + ◌ी बी	ब + ◌ु बु	ब + ◌ू बू	ब + ◌े बे	ब + ◌ै बै	ब + ◌ो बो	ब + ◌ौ बौ	ब + ◌ृ बृ	ब + ◌ं बं	ब + ः बः	ब + ◌ँ बँ

== Literature ==
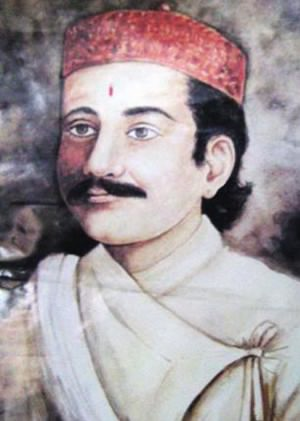
Bhanubhakta Acharya, considered the first poet (Ādikābi) in Nepali-language literature

Nepali developed significant literature within a short period of a hundred years in the 19th century. This literary explosion was fuelled by Sundarananda Bara (1833); Birsikka, an anonymous collection of folk tales; and a version of the ancient Indian epic Ramayana by Bhanubhakta Acharya (d. 1868). The contribution of trio-laureates Lekhnath Paudyal, Laxmi Prasad Devkota, and Balkrishna Sama took Nepali to the level of other world languages. The contribution of writers outside Nepal, especially in Darjeeling in India, is also notable. Nepali language speakers have rapidly migrated around the globe in the last couple of decades and many books of Nepali language literature are published from different corners of the world. Diasporic literature has developed new ways of thinking and created a new branch in Nepali language literature.

== Dialects ==
Dialects of Nepali include Acchami, Baitadeli, Bajhangi, Bajurali, Bheri, Dadeldhuri, Dailekhi, Darchulali, Darchuli, Gandakeli, Humli, Purbeli, and Soradi. These dialects can be distinct from Standard Nepali. Mutual intelligibility between Baitadeli, Bajhangi, Bajurali (Bajura), Humli and Acchami is low. The dialect of the Nepali language spoken in Karnali Province is not mutually intelligible with Standard Nepali. The language is known by its old name as Khas Bhasa in Karnali.

== Sample text ==
The following is a sample text in Nepali, of Article 1 of the Universal Declaration of Human Rights, with a transliteration (IAST) and transcription (IPA).

Nepali in Devanagari Script
धारा १. सबै व्यक्तिहरू जन्मजात स्वतन्त्र हुन् ती सबैको समान अधिकार र महत्व छ। निजहरूमा विचार शक्ति र सद्विचार भएकोले निजहरूले आपसमा भातृत्वको भावनाबाट व्यवहार गर्नु पर्छ।

Transliteration (ISO)
Dhārā 1. Sabai vyaktiharū janmajāt svatantra hun tī sabaiko samān adhikār ra mahatva cha. Nijharūmā vicār śakti ra sadvicār bhaekole nijharūle āpasmā bhatṛtvako bhāvanabāṭa vyavahār garnu parcha.

Transcription (IPA)

[dʱaɾa ek sʌbʌi̯ bektiɦʌɾu d͡zʌnmʌd͡zat sotʌntɾʌ ɦun ti sʌbʌi̯ko sʌman ʌd(ʱ)ikaɾ rʌ mʌːtːo t͡sʰʌ nid͡zɦʌɾuma bit͡saɾ sʌkti ɾʌ sʌdbit͡sar bʱʌekole nid͡zɦʌɾule apʌsma bʱatɾitːoko bʱawʌnabaʈʌ bebaːr ɡʌɾnu pʌɾt͡sʰʌ]

Gloss (word-to-word)

Article 1. All human-beings from-birth independent are their all equal right and importance is. In themselves, intellect and conscience {endowed therefore} they {one another} brotherhood's spirit {treatment with} do must.

Article 1. All human beings are born free and equal in dignity and rights. They are endowed with reason and conscience and should act towards one another in a spirit of brotherhood.

== See also ==
- Bhanu Jayanti
- Gorkhaland movement
- List of Nepali-language poets
- List of Nepali-language writers
- List of Sahitya Akademi Translation Prize winners for Nepali
- List of Yuva Puraskar winners for Nepali
- Madan Puraskar
- Nepali Sahitya Parishad Sikkim
- Nepali Wikipedia

== Bibliography ==
- Richard Burghart (1984). "The Formation of the Concept of Nation-State in Nepal". The Journal of Asian Studies. 44 (1): 101–125. doi:10.2307/2056748. JSTOR 2056748. S2CID 154584368.
- Jain, Danesh; Cardona, George (26 July 2007). The Indo-Aryan Languages. Routledge. ISBN 9781135797119. Archived from the original on 15 January 2023.
- Hodgson, Brian Houghton (2013). Essays on the Languages, Literature, and Religion of Nepál and Tibet (Reprint ed.). Cambridge University Press. ISBN 9781108056083. Archived from the original on 15 January 2023.
