= Sahitya Akademi =

India's National Academy of Letters

- Emblem of Sahitya Akademi

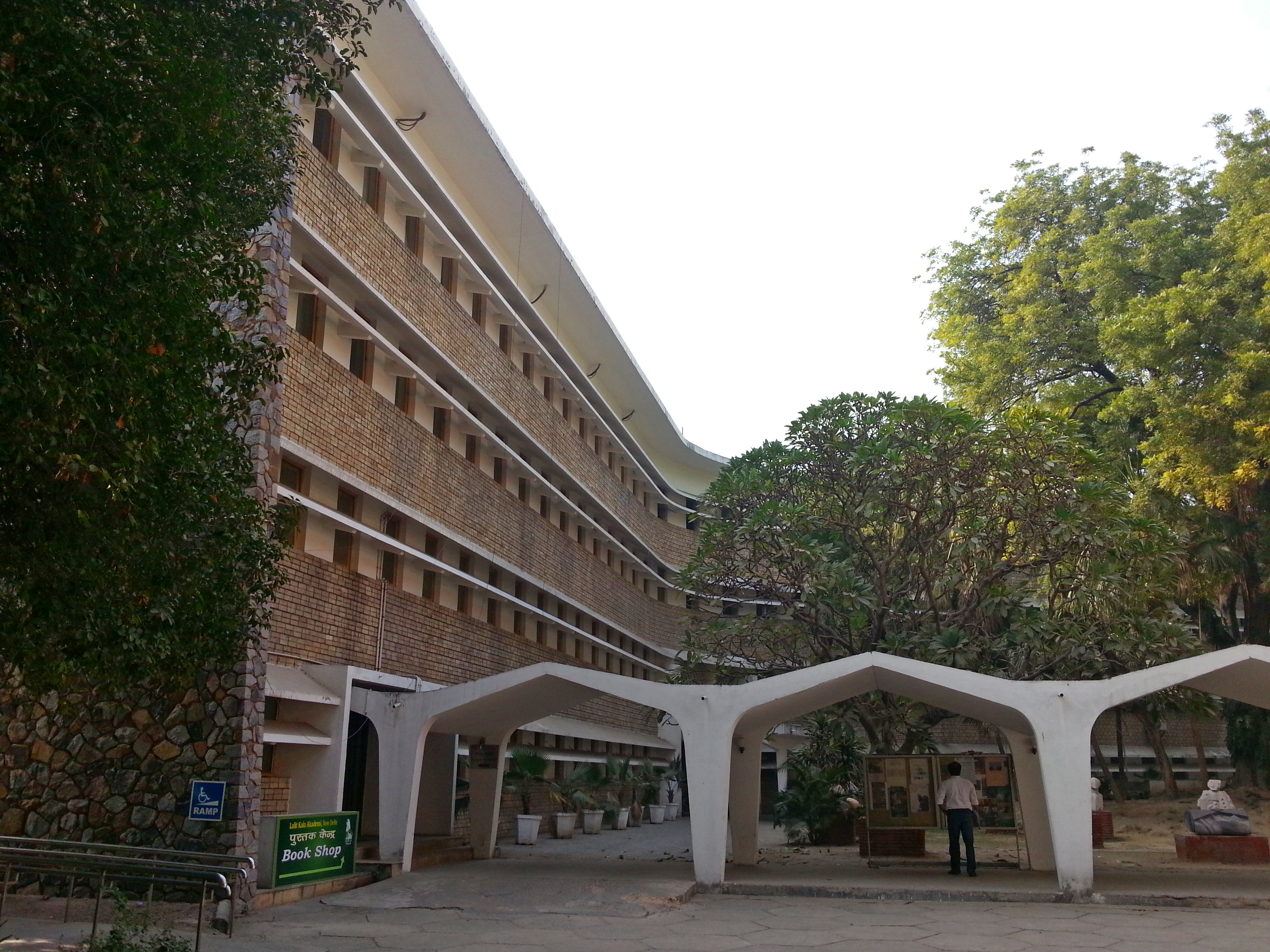
- Rabindra Bhawan, Delhi which houses the Sangeet Natak Akademi, Lalit Kala Akademi and Sahitya Akademi
- Abbreviation: SA
- Formation: 12 March 1954; 72 years ago
- Headquarters: Rabindra Bhawan, Delhi
- Location: New Delhi, India
- Region served: India
- President: Madhav Kaushik
- Publication: Indian Literature
- Parent organisation: Ministry of Culture, Government of India
- Website: sahitya-akademi.gov.in

The Sahitya Akademi is an organisation recognised as India's "National Academy of Letters", dedicated to the promotion of literature in the languages of India. Founded on 12 March 1954, it is supported by, though independent of, the Indian government. Its office is located in Rabindra Bhavan near Mandi House in Delhi.

The Sahitya Akademi organises national and regional workshops and seminars; provides research and travel grants to authors; publishes books and journals, including the Encyclopaedia of Indian Literature; and presents the annual Sahitya Akademi Award of INR. 100,000 in each of the 24 languages it supports, as well as the Sahitya Akademi Fellowship for lifetime achievement.

The Sahitya Akademi Library is one of the largest multi-lingual libraries in India, with a rich collection of books on literature and allied subjects.

It publishes two bimonthly literary journals: Indian Literature in English and Samkaleen Bharatiya Sahitya in Hindi.

== Recognised literary languages ==
The Sahitya Akademi supports work in the following 24 languages, 22 of which are included in the Eighth Schedule to the Constitution of India, alongside English and Rajasthani:

Assamese, Bengali, Bodo, Dogri, English, Gujarati, Hindi, Kannada, Kashmiri, Konkani, Maithili, Malayalam, Manipuri, Marathi, Nepali, Odia, Punjabi, Rajasthani, Sanskrit, Santhali, Sindhi, Tamil, Telugu, and Urdu.

The recognition of languages by Sahitya Akademi is independent from the recognition of languages by the Eighth Schedule to the Constitution of India.

Recognition by the Akademi before enlistment to the 8th Schedule

- Sindhi had been recognised by Sahitya Akademi in the year 1956, long before it was recognised by the Twenty-first Amendment of the Constitution of India in 1967.
- Maithili had been recognised by Sahitya Akademi in 1966, long before it was recognised by the Ninety-second Amendment of the Constitution of India in 2003.
- Dogri had been recognised by Sahitya Akademi in 1969, long before it was recognised by the Ninety-second Amendment of the Constitution of India in 2003.
- Manipuri had been recognised by Sahitya Akademi in 1971, long before it was recognised by the Seventy-first Amendment of the Constitution of India in 1992.
- Konkani and Nepali had been recognised by Sahitya Akademi in 1975, long before these were recognised by the Seventy-first Amendment of the Constitution of India in 1992.

Recognition by the Akademi after enlistment to the 8th Schedule

- Santhali was recognised by Sahitya Akademi in 2004, after it had been recognised by the Ninety-second Amendment of the Constitution of India in 2003.
- Bodo was recognised by Sahitya Akademi in 2005, after it had been recognised by the Ninety-second Amendment of the Constitution of India in 2003.

== History ==
The idea of constituting a National Academy of Letters in India was considered by the colonial British government, and in 1944 a proposal from the Royal Asiatic Society of Bengal for the formation of a 'National Cultural Trust' was, in principle, accepted. The original plan conceived of three institutions, or academies, devoted to the visual arts, performing arts, and letters. The independent Government of India carried out this proposal, constituting a National Academy of Letters, called the 'Sahitya Akademi' by a government resolution on 15 December 1952.

The first General Council of the Akademi included members such as Sarvepalli Radhakrishnan, Abul Kalam Azad, C. Rajagopalachari, K. M. Panikkar, K.M. Munshi, Zakir Husain, Umashankar Joshi, Mahadevi Varma, D. V. Gundappa, Ramdhari Singh Dinkar, and was presided over by the then-Prime Minister, Jawaharlal Nehru. The Government of India clarified that the choice of Prime Minister Nehru as the first chairperson was "not because he is Prime Minister, but because he has carved out for himself a distinctive place as a writer and author."

The Sahitya Akademi was formally inaugurated on 12 March 1954 in New Delhi. A ceremony was held in the Indian Parliament's Central Hall, with speeches by Maulana Abul Kalam Azad and Sarvepalli Radhakrishnan. Radhakrishnan elaborated on the purpose of the Sahitya Akademi in his speech, noting that,

"The phrase, Sahitya Akademi, combines two words. 'Sahitya' is Sanskrit, and 'Academy' is Greek. This name suggests our universal outlook and aspiration. Sahitya is a literary composition; Academy is an assembly of men who are interested in the subject. So Sahitya Akademi will be an assembly of all those who are interested in creative and critical literature. It is the purpose of this Akademi to recognise men of achievement in letters, to encourage men of promise in letters, to educate public taste and to improve standards of literature and literary criticism."

A key concern in the early days of the Sahitya Akademi was the establishment of its autonomy from the Central Government. This concern was echoed by the Prime Minister, who noted that, "...it is an honour to be the President of an organisation which includes it in its fold the eminent writers of India in various languages. As President of that Akademi I may tell you quite frankly, I would not like the Prime Minister to interfere in my work." The first Council made recommendations to amend the Akademi's governing constitution, including proposals to have the chairman elected by the council and not appointed by the Government. Some of these suggestions were incorporated, and the Akademi was constituted as a society under the Societies Registration Act of 1860, as it had not originally been incorporated by an Act of Parliament, but by an executive order. The council was reconstituted and elected Prime Minister Nehru as its president, and he continued in that capacity until his death in 1964.

Subsequent presidents of the Sahitya Akademi have included S. Radhakrishnan (1958) who succeeded Jawaharlal Nehru after serving as the vice-president along with him; Zakir Hussain (1963); Suniti Kumar Chatterjee (1967); K.R. Srinivasa Iyengar (1969, and re-elected in 1973); Umashankar Joshi (1978); Vinayaka Krishna Gokak (1983); Birendra Kumar Bhattacharya (1988); U. R. Ananthamurthy (1993); Ramakanta Rath (1998); and Gopi Chand Narang (2003). Sunil Gangopadhyay was elected president in 2008, and held office until his death in 2012. Vishwanath Prasad Tiwari served as president from 2013 to 2018. The Akademi has never elected a female president although, Mahasweta Devi in 2003 and Pratibha Ray in 2018 unsuccessfully contested against Gopi Chand Narang and Chandrashekar Kambara respectively for the position.

The logo of Sahitya Akademi was designed by Satyajit Ray.

== Constitution and structure ==
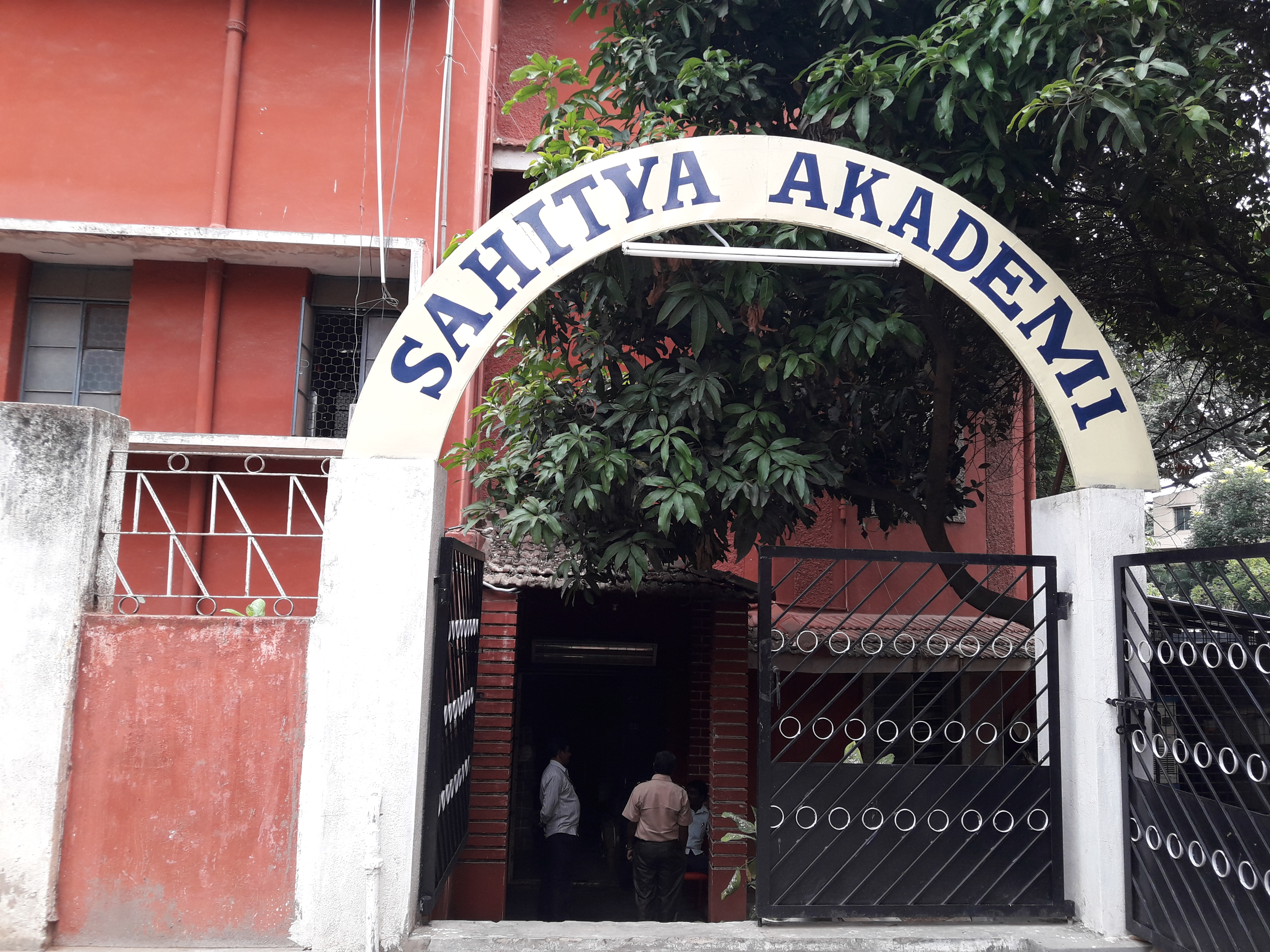
Sahitya Akademi Regional Office at Bengaluru

The Sahitya Akademi was constituted by the Government of India by a resolution passed on 15 December 1952. It was formally inaugurated on 12 March 1954. It initially functioned under executive order, but was subsequently registered as a society under the Indian Societies Registration Act, 1860. The constitution of the Sahitya Akademi provides that it shall be run by three authorities — a General Council, an Executive Board, and a Finance Committee.

The General Council is empowered to elect a president and vice-president, from a panel of three candidates chosen by the executive board. In addition to these, the executive board appoints a secretary, who functions as both the Secretary of the Akademi and as ex-officio secretary of all three governing bodies.

=== General Council ===
The General Council of the Sahitya Akademi operates for a term of five years, following which it is reconstituted. It meets once a year and performs several important functions, including appointing the Akademi's president and vice-president, electing members of the executive board, framing rules and procedures for the Akademi, and electing fellows on the recommendation of the board.

The General Council consists of the following members:

- The president and the financial advisor. The current president of the Sahitya Akademi is Chandrashekhara Kambara.
- Five persons nominated by the Government of India, including one each from the National Book Trust, the Department of Culture, and the Ministry of Information and Broadcasting
- One person from each state and union territory in India (these are to be nominated by the outgoing General Council, based on recommendations from the states and union territories)
- One person to represent each language supported by the Sahitya Akademi (nominated by the outgoing General Council)
- A representative each, from a maximum of 20 universities, with post-graduate departments in the humanities (selected by the outgoing Council)
- Eight other persons from the field of letters (nominated from by the outgoing General Council)
- Representatives from the Sangeet Natak Akademi, the Lalit Kala Akademi, the Indian Council for Cultural Relations, the Raja Rammohun Roy Library, and a representative from an Indian publisher based on recommendations from publishers' associations.

=== Executive Board ===
The executive board of the Sahitya Akademi exercises executive authority and is responsible for supervising and controlling the Akademi's work. It prepares the Akademi's annual budget, appoints the secretary, and prepares panels of nominees for the General Council to consider and select fellows. It consists of the president, the vice-president, the financial advisor, two of the Government of India's nominees in the General Council (one of whom must represent the Ministry of Culture) and one person to represent each of the Akademi's supported languages, as nominated by the General Council.

=== Finance Committee ===
The finance committee's role is to prescribe the limit for total expenditure by the Sahitya Akademi in a financial year, and consider and recommend budget estimates to the executive board. The finance committee consists of a financial advisor, a nominee from the Government of India, a representative each from the General Council and Executive Board, and the vice-president of the Akademi. The accounts of the Sahitya Akademi are audited by the Auditor General of India.

== Publications and activities ==
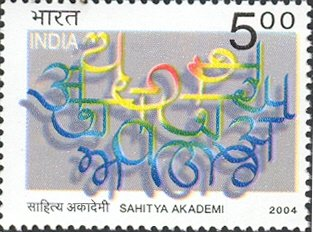
2004 Indian stamp of Sahitya Akademi

The Sahitya Akademi publishes several regular publications, in addition to its bi-monthly literary journals, Indian Literature and Samkaleen Bhartiya Sahitya. It undertakes bibliographic surveys, conducts translation workshops, seminars, and an annual festival of letters.

=== Publications ===
The Sahitya Akademi publishes bibliographies, compilations, and critical editions in addition to publishing individual works and anthologies of literature and translation in the 24 languages that it supports. Amongst other things, it publishes the National Bibliography of Indian Literature (NBIL), an ongoing selective index of publications in 24 languages. The first series of the NBIL consisted of four volumes, spanning literature published between 1901 and 1953. The Sahitya Akademi has stated that the second series will cover literature published between 1954 and 2000. The second series will consist of 16 volumes, of which seven have been published. In addition, the Sahitya Akademi has published the Collected Works of Maulana Azad in Urdu and Telugu, and critical editions of books by Kalidasa, Bankimchandra Chatterjee, and Rabindranath Tagore.

The Sahitya Akademi maintains reference materials for Indian literature, including the National Register of Translators, the Who's Who of Indian Writers, and the Who's Who of Sanskrit literature. Two ongoing series of reference material are the Makers of Indian Literature, which consist of biographical monographs on Indian writers, and Histories of Indian Literature, 18 of which have been published thus far. It publish two journal: Indian Literature (started in 1957) in English, and Samakaleen Bharatiya Sahitya (started in 1980) in Hindi.

In 1987, it published a book (Bulhe Shah: Volume 141) on the life of Bulleh Shah (authored by Surindar Singh Kohli).

=== Activities ===
The Sahitya Akademi holds over 100 programmes related to Indian literature every year across India. It holds frequent seminars on Indian literature, as well as translation workshops. In addition, it holds several regular and annual events, including a Festival of Letters and the Samvatsar Annual Lecture.

==== International seminars ====
The Sahitya Akademi periodically holds International Seminars, sometimes in collaboration with the Indian Council for Cultural Relations. The first international seminar was held in 1961, in New Delhi, to mark 100 years since the birth of Rabindranath Tagore. About 25 writers from 16 countries, along with 39 writers from India met over four days to discuss and commemorate Tagore's works. Attendees included Aldous Huxley, Martin Wickremesinghe, Jean Guehenno, Zaki Naguib Mahmoud, Isaiah Berlin, and Louis Untermeyer as well as Amrita Pritam, Ramdhari Sinha Dinkar, Rayaprolu Subba Rao, and Premendra Mitra. In 1991, the Akademi organised a second International Seminar on Tagore in collaboration with the Sangeet Natak Akademi, the Lalit Kala Akademi and the Indian Council for Cultural Relations.

The Akademi's second International Seminar from 8 December to 12 December 1975, was also held in New Delhi and focused on the Ramayana tradition in Asia. Participants, including U Thein Han, Soewito Santoso, Harry M. Buck, C.E. Godakumbra, Kapila Vatsyayan, Camille Bulke and Umashankar Joshi, presented 44 papers on Ramayana traditions, which were published by the Akademi in a commemorative volume. Suniti Kumar Chatterji also participated in second Seminar. A second International seminar on the same theme was held in New Delhi in 1981.

International Seminars have since been held to mark the birth centenary of Hindi-language writer Premchand, in 1981; to mark the birth centenary of Tamil-language poet Subramania Bharti in 1983; on the Mahabharata, in 1987; and on 'the Narrative' in 1990.

==== Annual Festival of Letters ====
The Sahitya Akademi's Annual Festival of Letters is held in February and is the occasion at which the Akademi presents its awards. The festival is accompanied by an exhibition that covers major literary events of the previous year, as well as a 'Writers' Meet' which is a literary seminar spanning three days.

==== Samvatsar Annual Lecture ====
The Samvatsar Annual Lecture is organised by the Sahitya Akademi and is delivered during the Akademi's Annual Festival of Letters. The Sahitya Akademi notes that these lectures "should open up new vistas of thinking regarding a literary movement, a current literary trend, some original thinking about a great writer or a great classic or a new path in literary criticism or literary creation". The Lectures have been delivered since 1986 by people including the Hindi writer Sachchidananda Vatsyayan (1986), Marathi poet and writer Vinda Karandikar (1991), Assamese novelist Nabakanta Barua (1994), and Malayalam author and director, M T Vasudevan Nair (1999).

In 2014, the lecture was delivered by Girish Karnad, a Kannada playwright and author. The most recent lecture was delivered by Chandrashekhar Shankar Dharmadhikari, an author, lawyer, and former judge in the Bombay High Court on 17 February 2016.

==== 'Meet the Author' programmes ====
The Sahitya Akademi organises regular public interactions with published Indian authors. These sessions, titled 'Meet the Author' consist of a 40-minute lecture by the invited author followed by an open session of questions and discussions. 'Meet the Author' programmes have been conducted in Delhi, Mumbai, Kolkata, Chennai, and Bengaluru. Over 180 authors have participated to date.

To complement this, the Sahitya Akademi has held a parallel lecture series titled 'Men in Books' in which the Akademi invites persons distinguished for interdisciplinary studies to speak about literature. Notable speakers in the past have included film-maker Adoor Gopalakrishnan, journalist Dilip Padgaonkar, lawyer Laxmi Mall Singhvi, and former prime minister Atal Bihari Vajpayee.

==== Kavi Anuvadak ====
The Kavi Anuvadak programmes, started in 2001, consist of a live performance of poetry in the original language and in translation. Nine Kavi Anuvadaks have been held to date, featuring, amongst others, K. Satchidanandan, Manglesh Dabral, and Ayyappa Paniker.

==== Sahitya Akademi Award ====
Sahitya Akademi Award (Devnagari: साहित्य अकादमी पुरस्कार) is a literary honor in India which Sahitya Akademi annually confers on writers of the most outstanding books of literary merit published in any of the major Indian languages recognised by the Akademi.

==== Yuva Puraskar ====
Sahitya Akademi confers annually the Yuva Puraskar to young writers (under 35 years) of outstanding works in one of the 24 major Indian languages. It was founded in 2011.

==== Other programmes ====
Other programmes organised by the Sahitya Akademi include the Mulakat lectures, a special platform for lesser-known authors; the Through My Window lectures, in which one author speaks on the works of another Indian author; and the Loka programmes on Indian folklore and the Kavisandhi poetry readings.

== Controversies and Parliamentary Committee reviews ==
There have been widespread allegations of corruption and controversial appointments under the presidency of Gopi Chand Narang who headed Sahitya Akademi from 2003 to 2007 and the president Vishwanath Prasad Tiwari. Agrahara Krishnamurthy, appointed as the Secretary of Sahitya Akademi by Narang, had undergone a CBI probe in a paper purchase scam at the time of his appointment, and was censured and forced to retire after being accused of financial irregularities in 2012. Agrahara Krishnamurthy who has been granted relief by the High Court has alleged a conspiracy against him by a cabal of writers and officials. The appointment by a committee composed of Narang, Tiwari and others of the current Secretary K. Sreenivasa Rao, is controversial as Rao's academic credentials for the top job, who had joined the Akademi as a lower division clerk (LDC), are said to be insufficient and extremely dubious.

The 171st Parliamentary Standing Committee on the functioning of Sahitya Akademi and three other institutions chaired by Sitaram Yechury and tabled at the Lok Sabha in August 2011 states, "It was felt that most of these institutions were not able to live up to the original mandates set out by their founding fathers. Controversies of different kind involving these institutions that keep cropping up from time to time, had caught this Committee's attention. Questions were also raised about the indifference and helplessness shown by the Ministry of Culture to do anything in the face of autonomy enjoyed by these institutions."

The committee also urged Sahitya Akademi to adopt the recommendation of the Haksar Committee (1988) of having its head appointed by the president of India, a practice followed by Sangeet Natak and Lalit Kala Akademies, to avoid "the inevitable complications of the existing system of elections."

=== Controversial appointments ===
Many controversial appointments of unqualified candidates to key positions at the Sahitya Akademi, done during Gopi Chand Narang's time, continue unchallenged to this day. Khurshid Alam and Mrignayani Gupta, both dismissed in 2004 for presenting counterfeit degree certificates, have made a backdoor entry and have been subsequently promoted to higher positions. There have been widespread allegations in the Hindi press that the certificates of the current secretary, K. Sreenivasa Rao, who completed his M.Phil. and PhD degrees while being employed as deputy secretary (administration) at the Sahitya Akademi without availing a single day's leave, are fake and fraudulent. Appeals by the writers community to the Ministry of Culture to launch an inquiry have not yielded any result.

=== Sahitya Akademi Awards controversy ===
It has been alleged time and again that the procedure of nomination of litterateurs for the coveted Sahitya Akademi Awards is not transparent. The ground-list of books (from which the jury members make two short-lists and the final selection for the award) is supposed to be made by the General Council. But the books are provided to this council by the bureaucrats and employees of the Akademi who are allegedly unqualified to make any kind of literary selection. Though the award regulations makes the recommendations of the Language Advisory Board mandatory, the recommendations of the board are often dismissed and ignored by the officials without citing any reason. This lack of transparency and rigour in the selection process has resulted in a lot of controversy. It has even resulted in writers being forced to return the award when it has been proven that the selection procedure was fraudulent, as was the case with the Sahitya Akademi award for a translation into Odia in 1999.

Sahitya Akademi is also highly criticized by writers such as Khushwant Singh for ignoring eminent writers and awarding below-par writers and sub-standard literary works.

== See also ==
- List of Sahitya Akademi Award winners
- Jnanpith Award
- Sahitya Kala Parishad
- Manipuri Sahitya Parishad
- Karnataka Sahitya Academy
