= Kumal people =

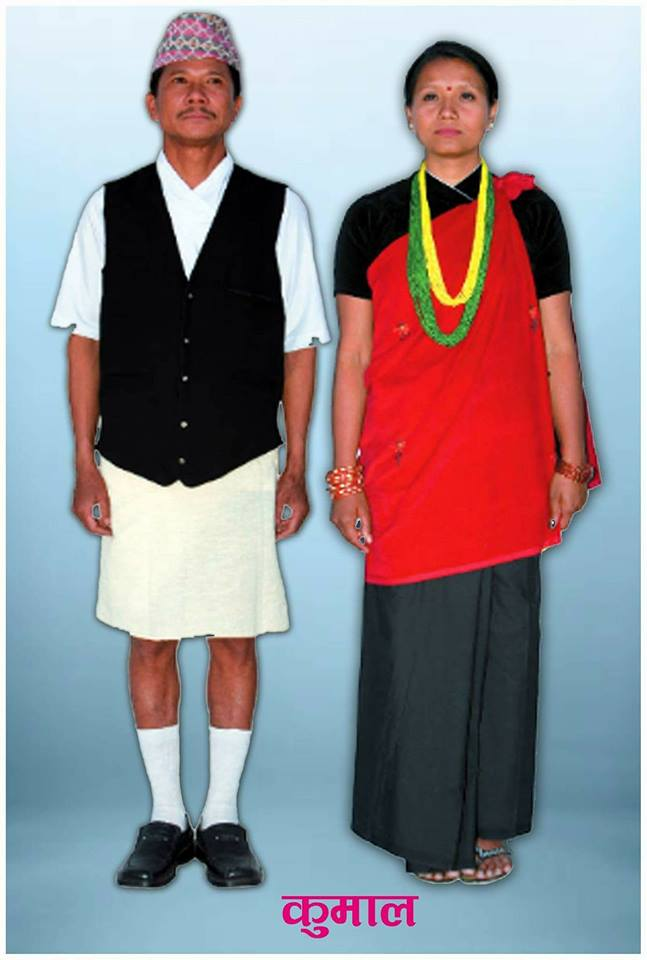
- A Kumal man and woman in their ethnic wear

Total population
- 121,000 (2011 Census)

Regions with significant populations
- Nepal

Languages
- Kumal, Nepali

Religion
- Hinduism 98%, Christianity 1.4%

Related ethnic groups
- Magar, Bote, Danuwar, Darai, Majhi

Kumal (Nepali: कुमाल) is an ethnic group in Nepal, traditionally associated with pottery. Their traditional profession is endangered due to competition from cheaper, more durable industrial pots. Fewer youths learn the skills. They are found to inhabit in the Terai, inner Terai and Mid-hills close to the riverbanks where bioresearches are rich to continue to their traditional occupation. Their traditional dance, the Pangdure, is considered endangered.

== Language ==
Kumal people speak the Kumal language. According to the population census of 2011, 121,000 Kumals live in Nepal; there are 12,000 native speakers of the Kumal language.

== Geographic distribution ==
The 2011 Nepal census classifies the Kumal people within the broader social group of Mountain/Hill Janajati. At the time of the Nepal census of 2011, 121,196 people (0.5% of the population of Nepal) were Kumal. The frequency of Kumal people by province was as follows:

- Gandaki Province (1.5%)
- Lumbini Province (1.0%)
- Bagmati Province (0.3%)
- Madhesh Province (0.2%)
- Koshi Province (0.2%)
- Karnali Province (0.1%)
- Sudurpashchim Province (0.1%)

The frequency of Kumal people was higher than national average (0.5%) in the following districts:

- Nawalpur (3.9%)
- Arghakhanchi (3.4%)
- Gulmi (3.1%)
- Gorkha (3.0%)
- Palpa (2.6%)
- Tanahun (2.5%)
- Chitwan (1.6%)
- Dang (1.5%)
- Pyuthan (1.5%)
- Dhading (1.4%)
- Lamjung (1.0%)
- Nuwakot (0.9%)
- Parasi (0.7%)
- Baglung (0.6%)
- Parsa (0.6%)
- Sankhuwasabha (0.6%)
