= Department of Official Language =

Government of India ministry

- राजभाषा विभाग
- Ministry of Home Affairs

- Emblem of India

Ministry overview
- Formed: June 1975
- Jurisdiction: Republic of India
- Headquarters: NDCC-II Bhawan, 'B' Wing 4th Floor, Jai Singh Road New Delhi - 110001
- Minister responsible: Amit Shah, Cabinet Minister
- Deputy Minister responsible: Nityanand Rai, Minister of State
- Ministry executives: Ms. Ansuli Arya, IAS, Secretary; Dr. Minakshi Jolly, CSS, Joint Secretary
- Parent department: Ministry of Home Affairs
- Child agencies: * Central Translation Bureau; * Central Hindi Training Institutes
- Website: rajbhasha.gov.in/en

The Department of Official Language is the Government of India's department responsible for the implementation of the provisions of the Constitution relating to official languages and the provisions of the Official Languages Act, 1963. Department of Official Language was set up in June 1975 as an independent Department of the Ministry of Home Affairs.

== History ==
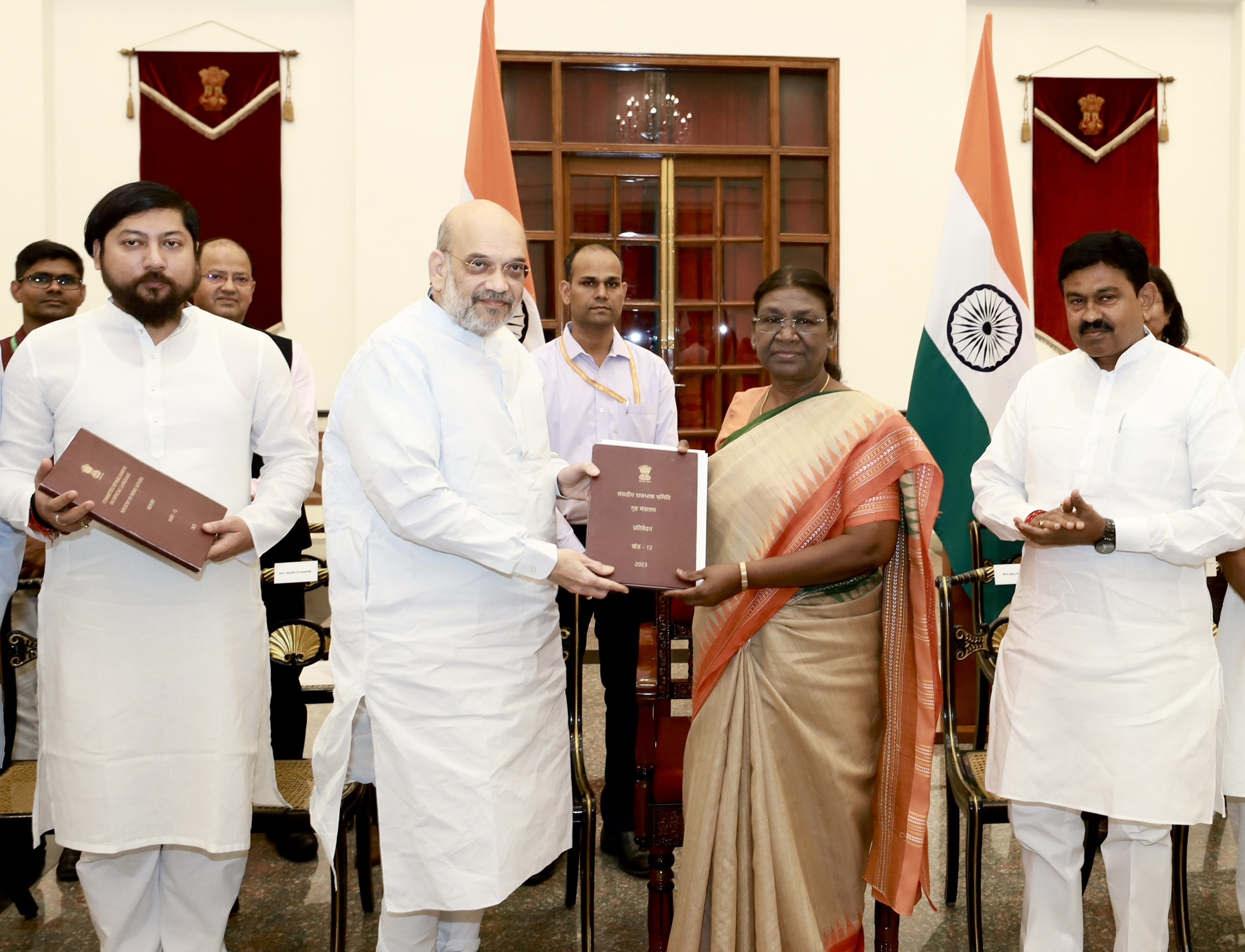
Amit Shah presents 12th Volume of the Official Language Committee’s Report to the President of India Droupadi Murmu in 2023.

The official languages of British India were English, Urdu and later Hindustani, with English being used for purposes at the central level. The Indian constitution adopted in 1950 envisaged that English would be phased out in favour of Hindi, over a fifteen-year period, but gave Parliament the power to, by law, provide for the continued use of English even thereafter. Plans to make Hindi the sole official language of the Republic were met with resistance in many parts of the country. English and Hindi continue to be used today, in combination with others (at the central level and in some states) official languages.

The legal framework governing the use of languages for official purpose currently is the Official Languages Act, 1963, the Official Language Rules, 1976, and various state laws, as well as rules and regulations made by the central government and the states.

The Indian constitution, in 1950, declared Hindi in Devanagari script to be the official language of the union. Unless Parliament decided otherwise, the use of English for official purposes was to cease 15 years after the constitution came into effect, i.e., on 26 January 1965. The prospect of the changeover, however, led to much alarm in the non-Hindi-speaking areas of India, especially Dravidian-speaking states whose languages were not related to Hindi at all. As a result, Parliament enacted the Official Languages Act, 1963, which provided for the continued use of English for official purposes along with Hindi, even after 1965.

Department of Official Language was set up in June 1975 as an independent Department of the Ministry of Home Affairs.

== Organizational structure ==
Minister of Home Affairs Amit Shah is the head of the department. The department is divided into four main offices.

- Central Translation Bureau
- Central Hindi Training Institutes
- Committee of Parliament on Official Language
- Regional Implementation Offices

== Activities ==
Annual targets are set by the Department of Official Language regarding the amount of correspondence being carried out in Hindi. A Parliament Committee on Official Language constituted in 1976 periodically reviews the progress in the use of Hindi and submits a report to the President. The governmental body which makes policy decisions and established guidelines for the promotion of Hindi is the Kendriya Hindi Samiti (est. 1967). In every city that has more than ten central Government offices, a Town Official Language Implementation Committee is established and cash awards are given to government employees who write books in Hindi. All Central government offices and PSUs are to establish Hindi Cells for implementation of Hindi in their offices. Department hosts various events throughout the year to promote Hindi language.

=== Hindi Diwas ===
Hindi Day (Hindi: हिन्दी दिवस; Hindī Diwas) is celebrated every year on 14 September marking the declaration of Hindi language as official language of Union government of India. On 14 September 1949, Hindi was adopted as official language in India.

=== Workshops ===
Hindi language training workshops are arranged periodically by the department.

=== Awards ===
Various national awards are given to individuals as well as to other government departments for their exceptional work.

- Rajbhasha Gaurav Puraskar
- Rajbhasha Kirti Puraskar (for other internal government agencies)
- Official language Achievement Award

Ministry of Home Affairs in its order dated 25 March 2015 has changed name of two awards given annually on Hindi Divas. 'Indira Gandhi Rajbhasha Puraskar' instituted in 1986 changed to 'Rajbhasha Kirti Puraskar' and 'Rajiv Gandhi Rashtriya Gyan-Vigyan Maulik Pustak Lekhan Puraskar' changed to "Rajbhasha Gaurav Puraskar".

Bharatiya Bhasha Anubhag

On June 6, 2025, Amit Shah launched Bharatiya Bhasha Anubhag platform to facilitates translations between different regional language and Hindi.

== Parliamentary Committee on Official Language ==
In September 2024, Chairperson of the parliamentary committee, Amit Shah set the goal of using Hindi for country's entire work by the Independence Day, 2047 when the country will mark 100-years of freedom. The committee has developed a Hindi Shabdkosh in collaboration with Ministry of Education, adding thousands of new words from other local languages, enriching Hindi of wider vocabulary words. Department of Official Language is working on a software that enables translation of all languages of 8th Schedule to Hindi automatically.

== See also ==
- Languages of India
- Languages with official status in India
- List of Indian languages by number of native speakers
- Indian States by most popular languages
- Eighth Schedule to the Constitution of India
- Official Languages Act, 1963
