= Chandrapur Municipality =

Chandrapur चन्द्रपुर Chandranigahapur (चन्द्रनिगाहपुर)
- Municipality (नगरपालिका)
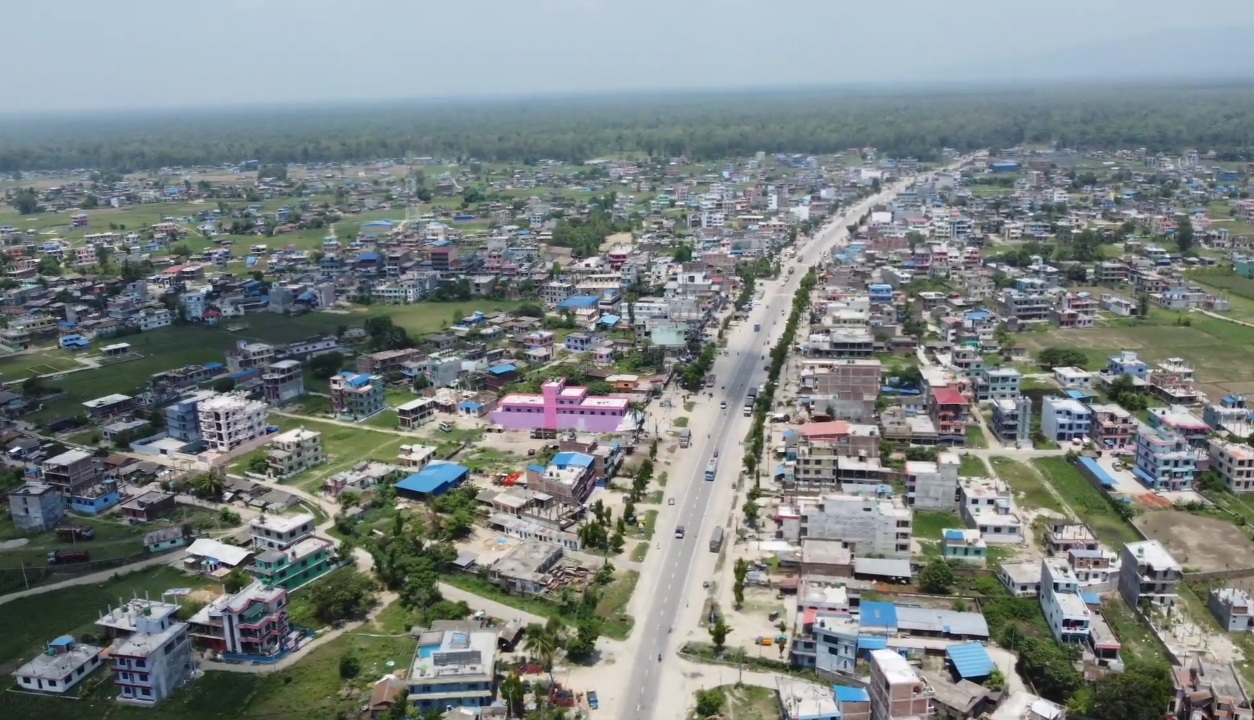
- Chandranigahapur

- Location of Chandrapur Municipality in Nepal
- Coordinates: 27.16°N 85.35°E
- Country: Nepal
- Province: Madhesh
- District: Rautahat

Government
  - Mayor: Mr. Sanjay Kumar Kafle(NC)
  - Deputy Mayor: Ms. Jaymala Chaudhary (NCP)

Area
  - Total: 231 km^{2} (89 sq mi)

Population (1991)
  - Total: 13,456
  - Density: 58.3/km^{2} (151/sq mi)
  - Ethnicities: Tharu Tamang Bahun Chhetri Magar Danuwar Majhi Madhesi people

Languages
  - Local: Nepali, Tharu, Tamang, Bajjika
- Time zone: UTC+5:45 (NST)
- Postal code: 44515
- Area code: 055
- Website: www.chandrapurmun.gov.np

Chandrapur Municipality (Nepali: चन्द्रपुर), locally known as Chandranigahapur or Chapur, is a municipality in Rautahat District of Madhesh Province of Nepal. Chandrapur municipality lies on the west side of Bagmati River along Chure range, bordering Gujara municipality in the west, Brindawan municipality in south, Bakaiya Rural Municipality & Bagmati Rural Municipality, Makwanpur of Makwanpur District of Bagmati Province in the north and Bagmati municipality of Sarlahi district in the east. The municipality was established on 18 May 2014 by merging Chandranigahapur, Judibela, Paurai, Santpur Matioun, and Dumariya Matioun VDCs.

According to the 2011 Nepal census, it had a population of 72,085 people living in 13,445 individual households.

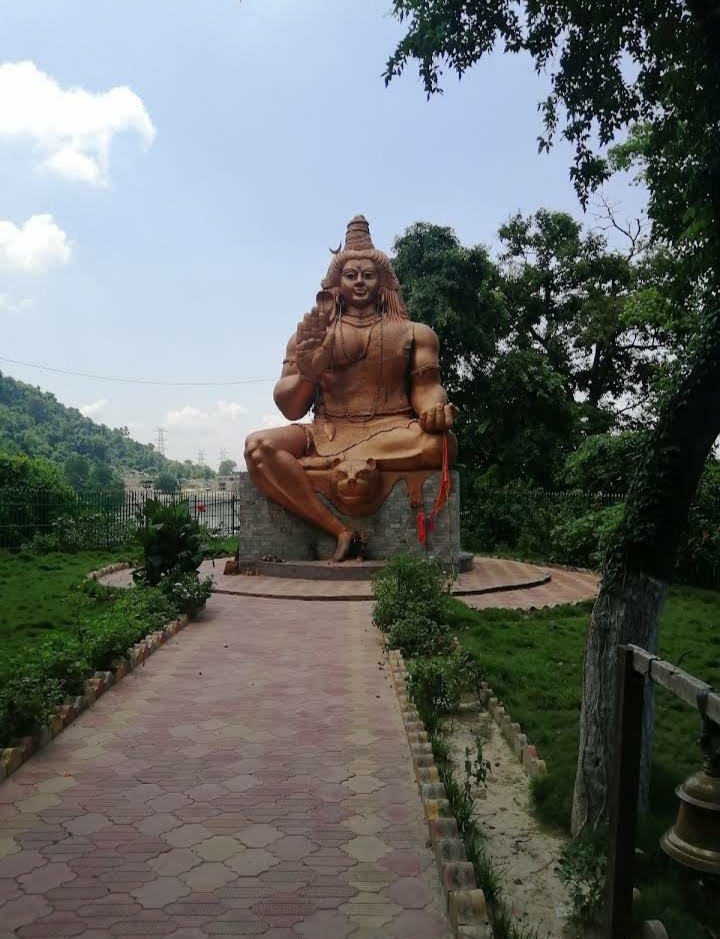
Nunthar Mahadev, Chandrapur Municipality

== History ==
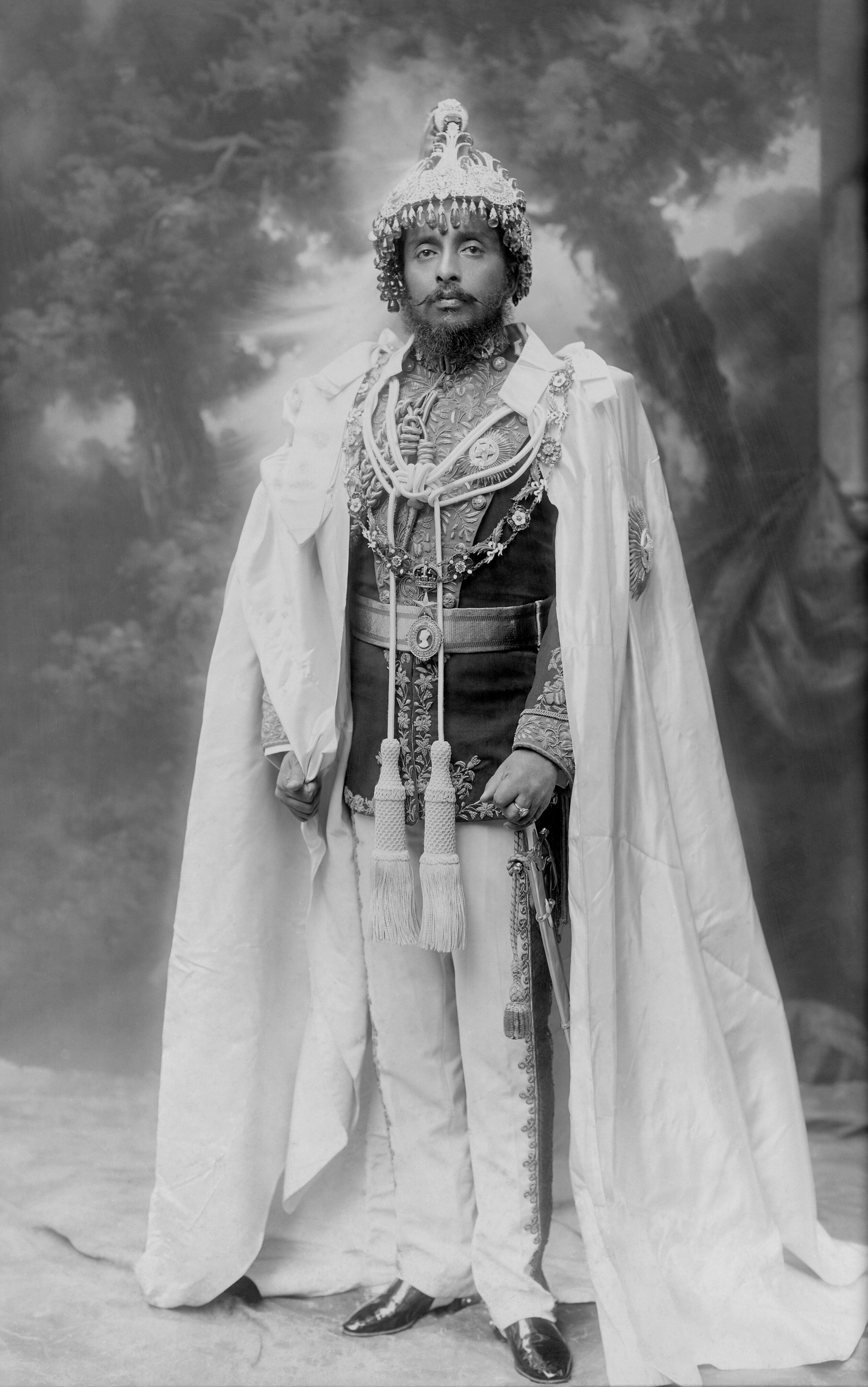
Chandra Shamsher

The town was named after the late Rana Prime Minister Chandra Shamsher, who used to come here for hunting. People started to live here after the naming of this place.

== Development activities ==
In remembrance of Girija Prasad Koirala the then Primeminister and president of Nepali congress people and Youth circle established a Picnic spot for the villagers of the Place. Cha.pur Hospital, Janata samudayik Hospital, Chandranigahapur Hospital, Road Development, etc. have also commenced.

Banks in Chandrapur include Siddhartha Bank Limited, Nepal SBI, Nepal Bank, NCC Bank, Everest Bank, Jyoti bikash Bank, Laxmi Development Bank, Prabhu Bank, Machhapuchhre Bank.

There is also a picnic spot as well tourist place called "sahid smiriti park" near the bank of Chandi River. At the centre of the park is a list of names of people in stone script, who contributed their life during the 10 years of revolution (1951/52-1962/63). It is the major picnic spot for the locals.

== Demographics ==
Chandrapur municipality had a population of 72,085, 50.2% female and 49.8% male.

Ethnic groups of Chandrapur Municipality
	Percent
Tharu	15.1%
Bahun	13.2%
Tamang	13.1%
Chhetri	9.4%
Magars	6.1%
Danuwar	4.3%
Majhi	3%
Others	38.5%

=== Languages ===
At the time of the 2011 Census of Nepal, 36.3% of the population spoke Nepali, 15.9% Bajjika, 12.6% Tamang, 11.7% Tharu, 9.6% Bhojpuri, 3.9% Maithili, 2.3% Magar, 2% Majhi, 1.4% Urdu and 4.3% other smaller languages as their first language.

=== Caste and ethnic groups ===
The largest ethnicity in Chandrapur is Tharu, who make 15.1% of the population followed by Hill Brahmin with 13.2%, Tamang 13.1%, Chhetri 9.4%, Magar 5%, Danuwar 3.1%, Chamar 3%, Teli 3%, Majhi 2.8% and various other ethnicities and caste make up around 32.5% of the total population.

=== Religion ===
At the time of the census 81% followed Hinduism, 13.3% Buddhism 2.7% Islam, 1.5% Prakriti, 1% Christianity and 0.5% other religions.

=== Literacy ===
According to the 2011 census 60% of the population could read and write whereas 3% of the population could read only. Meanwhile 37.4% could neither read nor write.

== Sports ==
In this town, many sports such as volleyball, football, and cricket are played. The Rautahat Women’s Football Team is renowned as the best women's team in Nepal and is known as the powerhouse of women's football in the country. Today, the first women’s football academy in Nepal is located in Chandrapur. Additionally, martial arts such as karate, wrestling, and taekwondo are also practiced here.

== Media ==
Chandrapur has two FM radio stations.

- Radio Nunthar F.M. - 102.6 MHz which is a community radio Station.
- Gunjan fm -105.3 MHz is another FM station in Chandranigahpur.

== Developing places ==
Chandaranighapur also Chandrapur itself is a developing town. Many of the places are considered to be developed in local context; whereas, some are considered to be ongoing developing places. Some of them are Judibela, Basantapur, Santapur, Nayabasti, Dumariya, Balchanpur, Banbahuary, etc.
