= Danuwar people =

Ethnic group indigenous to Nepal

Danuwar
दनुवार
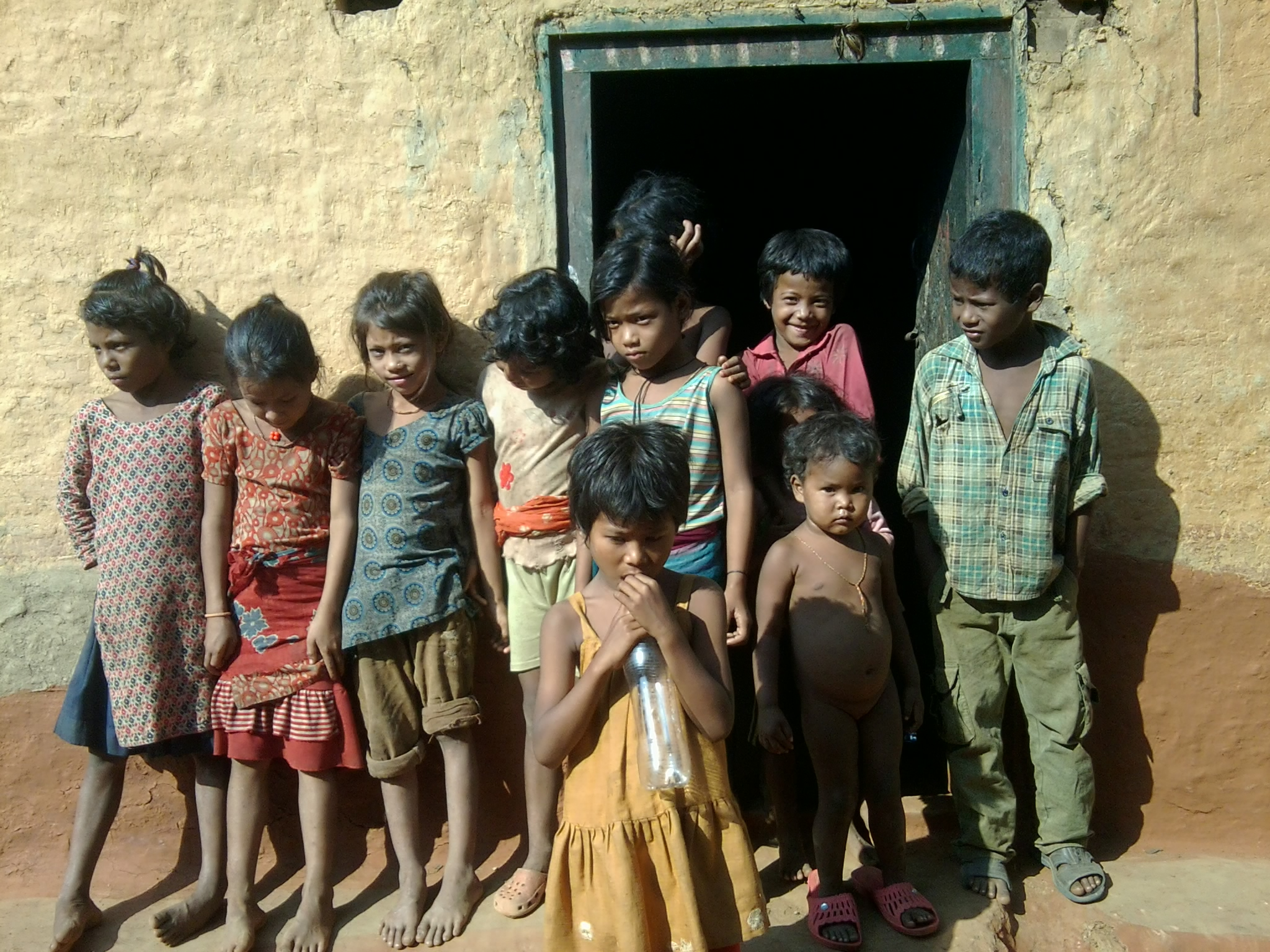
- Danuwar Children

Total population
- Nepal 82,784

Languages
- Danwar language, Nepali

Religion
- Hinduism 83.6%, Prakriti 15%, Christianity 1.15%

Related ethnic groups
- Tharu, Kumal, Bote, Darai, Majhi

The Danuwar are an ethnic group indigenous to the inner Terai regions of Nepal. They speak Danwar language. Danuwars can be found throughout the hills and Terai regions of central and eastern Nepal but they mainly reside in Sindhuli and Udayapur district. They have close physical and cultural similarities with Tharus of Terai. There are various sub groups largely Rajhan, Kachhade, Rai-Danuwar and Tharu Danuwar.

== Etymology ==
The word Danuwar is thought to be derived from the word 'Duna' which means leaves plates and people consuming food in it were later called Danuwar. Another theory suggest that it is derived from the Sanskrit Dronibar which signifies the plain land between the confluences of two rivers situated in the laps of the two hills.

== Language ==
Danuwar people speak Danwar language (also known as Danwari) which is close to Bote-Darai and Tharu languages. According to the census of 2011, there were a total of 46,000 who considered Danuwar as their mother tongue.

== Religion ==
Danuwar people consider themselves as Nature worshippers. However many follow Hinduism and some even wear 'sacred thread' like the Brahmins.
