= DHW =

DHW may stand for:

- Desperate Housewives
- Dhanwar Rai language
- Domestic hot water (plumbing)
- DHW Fototechnik, a successor to the German Franke & Heidecke company manufacturing the Rolleiflex medium format cameras and slide projectors between 2009 and 2015
