= Bote people =

Ethnic group of Nepal

Total population
- Nepal 11,258

Languages
- Bote language, Nepali

Religion
- Hinduism 88%, Prakriti 9.5%, Christianity 2.06%

Related ethnic groups
- Majhi, Tharu, Danuwar, Darai people

The Bote people are an ethnic group indigenous to the inner Terai regions of Nepal. They speak Bote language. The Bote people are well known for ferrying travellers across the rivers through the boats, which often are prepared from the trunks of the trees. They are scattered around the bank of Kaligandaki, Narayani and Rapti River of Nepal. Bote and Majhi people are known as the ‘King of water’. Their ancestral occupation is fishing, boating and searching gold in the river whose settlement is nearby river and forest. The dialect and culture of Bote people in several ways is similar to that of the Danuwars, Darai, Tharus and Majhi.

== Origin ==
There are two theories regarding the origin of Bote people. The community was known for laying tree trunks or branches across rivers to build makeshift seasonal bridges to allow people to cross. ‘Bot’ means a tree, and it could be that Nepali speakers started calling them Bote. Another theory suggest that they did not own land or houses, and took shelter under trees on the waterfront, they came to be known as Bote, since their existence revolved around the river.

== Culture ==
Botes are mainly engaged in ferry driving. Bote community lives in the banks of the rivers like Kali Gandaki, Rapti, Narayani, and Sunkoshi. They are divided into two groups: Pakha Bote and Pani Bote. Pakha Bote live in hills or arable land and Pani Bote live on the banks of the Kali Gandaki, Rapti, and Narayani rivers. Their primary economic base is boating, that is a nominal. There's similarity in custom and occupation of Bote or Majhi people though they live in different places of Nepal. Their dress is similar to that of Magar and Gurung dress but their language is what differentiates them from others. Living besides river, fishing boating, looking for gold, farming and rearing animals are the main occupations of these people.

== Language ==
Bote people speak Bote language which is close to Danuwar and Tharu languages. It is spoken in Gulmi, Nawalparasi, Chitwan, and Tanahu districts. According to the census of 2011, there were a total of 7,687 who considered Bote as their mother tongue.

== Religion ==
Most Bote practice an indigenous form of animism, in which shamanism, ancestor worship, and tattooing plays pivotal roles however many claim to be Hindu. The Bote people celebrate such festivals as Chandi Puja, Kalyan Puja, Bayu Puja, Bhuayar Puja, Sansari Mai Puja, Baje Bajei Puja, Jala Puja, Dunga Puja and Nhwagi Khhane Puja. Importantly, these people also offer Puja to the local ghosts, witches and spirits.
