= Dumriya =

Coordinates: 27°3′N 85°21′E

Dumariya(m) डुमरिया
- Interactive map of Dumariya(m)
- Country: Nepal
- Province: 2
- District: Rautahat
- Municipality: Chandrapur

Population (1991)
  - Total: 12,993
- Time zone: UTC+5:45 (Nepal Time)

Dumariya is a town and market center in Chandrapur Municipality in Rautahat District in Province No. 2 of south-eastern Nepal. The formerly village development committee was merged to form the municipality on 18 May 2014. This village has got a government hospital and ward committee both next to each other. This place has got four main electricity transformer among which two of them are privately settled for their own purpose. At the time of the 1991 Nepal census it had a population of 12,993.
