= Judibela =

Place in Madhes Province, Nepal

Judibela जुडीबेला
- Nickname: असनवा
- Location in Nepal
- Coordinates: 27.15°N 85.40°E
- Country: Nepal
- Zone: Narayani Zone
- District: Rautahat District

Population (1991)
  - Total: 3,910
- Time zone: UTC+5:45 (Nepal Time)

Judibela is a town and market center in Chandrapur Municipality in Rautahat District in the Madhes Province of south-eastern Nepal. The formerly village development committee was merged to form the municipality on 18 May 2014. At the time of the 1991 Nepal census it had a population of 3910 people living in 667 individual households. The largest school in this area is Shree Higher Secondary School Judibela. This school offers education from kindergarten to grade 12. This school in the Judibela area was established as an educational center. In grades 11 and 12, this school teaches subjects such as management, humanities, and pedagogy, as well as academic Nepali accounting and computer education. Dutta Bahadur Thing has been elected as the current ward chairman for a second term in this area.
