= Indian states by most spoken scheduled languages =

Most popular languages in Indian states and union territories

The following table contains the Indian states and union territories along with the most spoken scheduled languages used in the region. These are based on the 2011 census of India figures except Andhra Pradesh and Telangana, whose statistics are based on the 2001 census of the then unified Andhra Pradesh.

State / Union Territory	1	2	3	4	5
Andaman and Nicobar Islands	Bengali	Tamil	Telugu	Hindi	Malayalam
Andhra Pradesh	Telugu	Urdu	Tamil	Kannada	Odia
Arunachal Pradesh	Nishi	Adi	Apatani	Tagin	Hindi
Assam	Assamese	Bengali	Bodo	Hindi	Nepali
Bihar	Hindi (including Bihari languages)	Maithili	Urdu	Bengali	Santali
Chandigarh	Hindi	Punjabi	Urdu	Nepali	Bengali
Chhattisgarh	Hindi	Odia	Bengali	Telugu	Marathi
Dadra and Nagar Haveli and Daman and Diu	Gujarati	Hindi	Marathi	Konkani	Bengali
Delhi	Hindi	Punjabi	Urdu	Bengali	Maithili
Goa	Konkani	Marathi	Hindi	Kannada	Urdu
Gujarat	Gujarati	Hindi	Marathi	Sindhi	Urdu
Haryana	Hindi	Punjabi	Urdu	Bengali	Maithili
Himachal Pradesh	Hindi (including Pahari languages)	Punjabi	Nepali	Kashmiri	Dogri
Jammu and Kashmir and Ladakh	Kashmiri	Dogri	Hindi	Punjabi	Urdu
Jharkhand	Hindi (including Bihari languages)	Bengali	Santali	Urdu	Odia
Karnataka	Kannada	Telugu	Tamil	Urdu	Marathi
Kerala	Malayalam	Tamil	Tulu	Kannada	Konkani
Lakshadweep	Malayalam	Dhivehi	Tamil	Hindi	Telugu
Madhya Pradesh	Hindi	Marathi	Urdu	Sindhi	Gujarati
Maharashtra	Marathi	Hindi	Urdu	Gujarati	Telugu
Manipur	Meitei	Nepali	Hindi	Bengali	English
Meghalaya	Khasi	Garo	Bengali	Nepali	Hindi
Mizoram	Mizo	English	Hindi	Meitei	Chakma
Nagaland	Naga languages	English	Hindi	Assamese	Meitei
Odisha	Odia	Santali	Urdu	Telugu	Hindi
Puducherry	Tamil	Telugu	Malayalam	French	English
Punjab	Punjabi	Hindi	Urdu	Bengali	English
Rajasthan	Hindi (including Rajasthani languages)	Punjabi	Gujarati	Sindhi	Urdu
Sikkim	Nepali	Hindi	Bengali	Urdu	Punjabi
Tamil Nadu	Tamil	Telugu	Kannada	Urdu	Malayalam
Telangana	Telugu	Urdu	Gondi	Kannada	Marathi
Tripura	Bengali	Kokborok	Chakma	English	Meitei
Uttar Pradesh	Hindi (including Hindi languages)	Urdu	Punjabi	Nepali	Bengali
Uttarakhand	Hindi (including Pahari languages)	Urdu	Punjabi	Bengali	Nepali
West Bengal	Bengali	Hindi	Santali	Urdu	Nepali

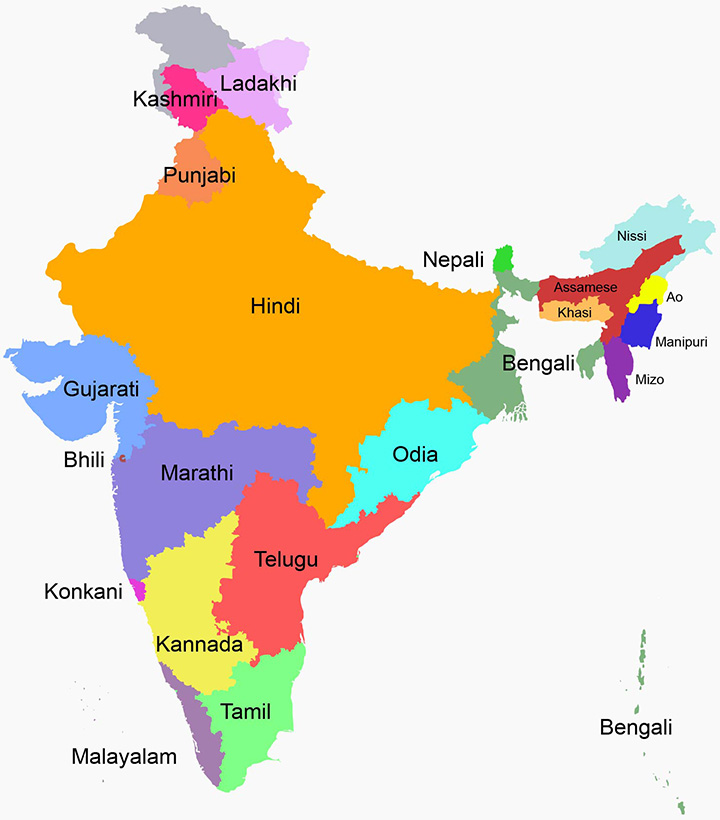
States and union territories of India by the most commonly spoken languages, among which most are scheduled but some are not scheduled languages, like Ao of Nagaland, Khasi of Meghalaya, Ladakhi of Ladakh, Mizo of Mizoram and Nyishi of Arunachal Pradesh. Exceptionally, Mizo attains state level official language status, despite not being a scheduled language. Nepali, despite being the lingua franca of Sikkim as well as a scheduled language, isn't the official language of Sikkim state. (Note: Some languages may be over- or underrepresented as the census data used is at the state-level. For example, while Urdu has 52 million speakers (2001), in no state is it a majority as the language itself is primarily limited to Indian Muslims yet has more native speakers than Gujarati.)

== See also ==
- Languages of India
- Languages with official status in India and its list of official languages by states.
