= Bihari languages =

Group of Eastern Indo-Aryan languages

Bihari
- Geographic distribution: India and Nepal
- Ethnicity: Biharis (demonym)
- Linguistic classification: Indo-European: Indo-Iranian; Indo-Aryan; Eastern; Bihari
- Subdivisions: Angika; Bajjika; Bhojpuri; Bote-Darai; Danwar; Kumhali; Magahi; Maithili; Sadanic; Tharuic

Language codes
- ISO 639-1: bh (deprecated)
- ISO 639-2 / 5: bih
- Glottolog: biha1245

Bihari languages are a group of the Indo-Aryan languages. The Bihari languages are mainly spoken in the Indian states of Bihar, Jharkhand, Uttar Pradesh, and West Bengal, and also in Nepal. The most widely spoken languages of the Bihari group are Bajjika, Angika, Bhojpuri, Magahi and Maithili.

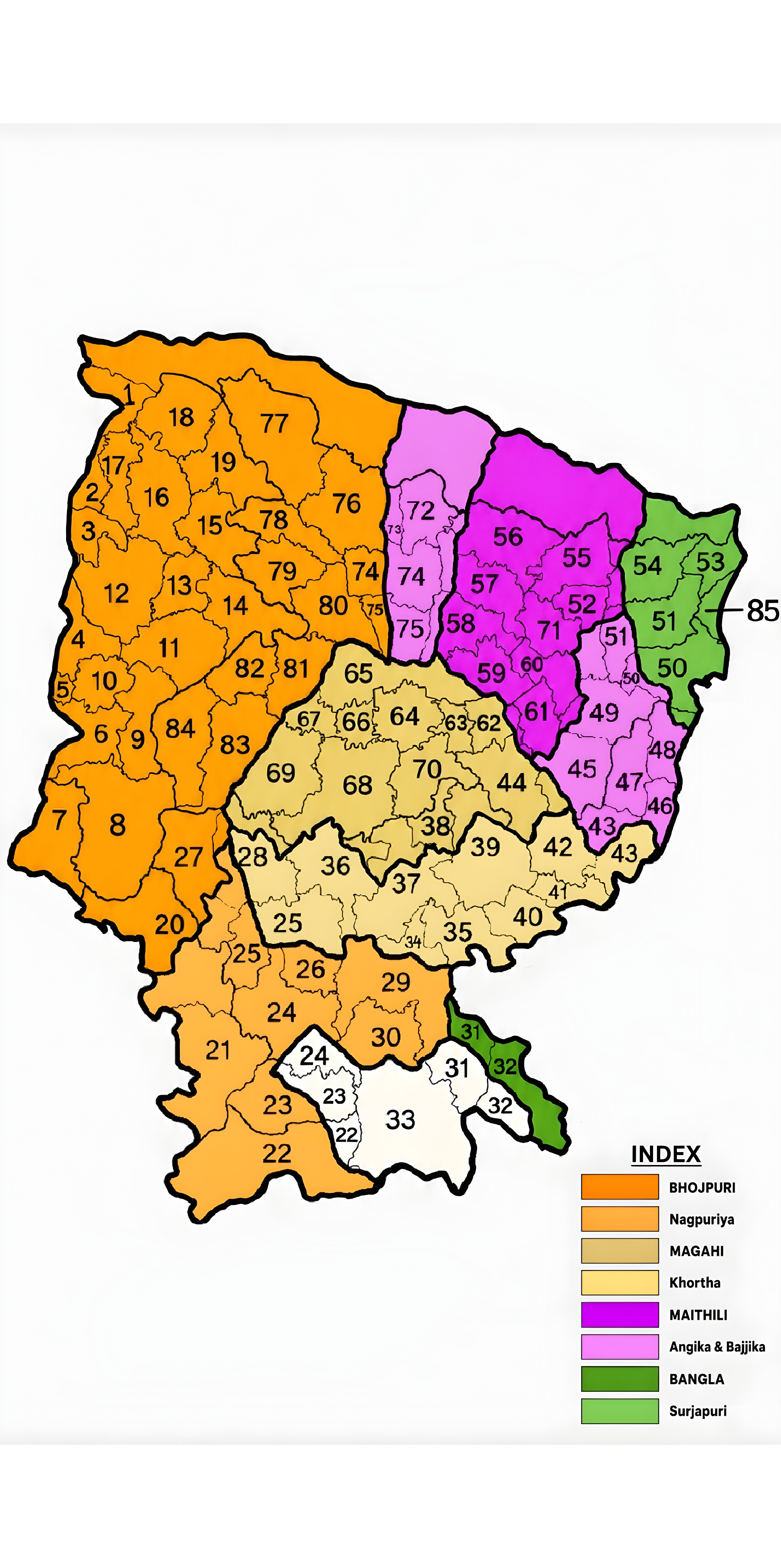
Cartographic Depiction of Maximum Extent of Bihari Languages, consisting of Bihar, Jharkhand, Eastern UP (Purvanchal), North-Eastern Chhattisgarh, and Sundargarh district of Odisha (this map also depicts Surjapuri and Bangla, although they are not classified as Bihari language).

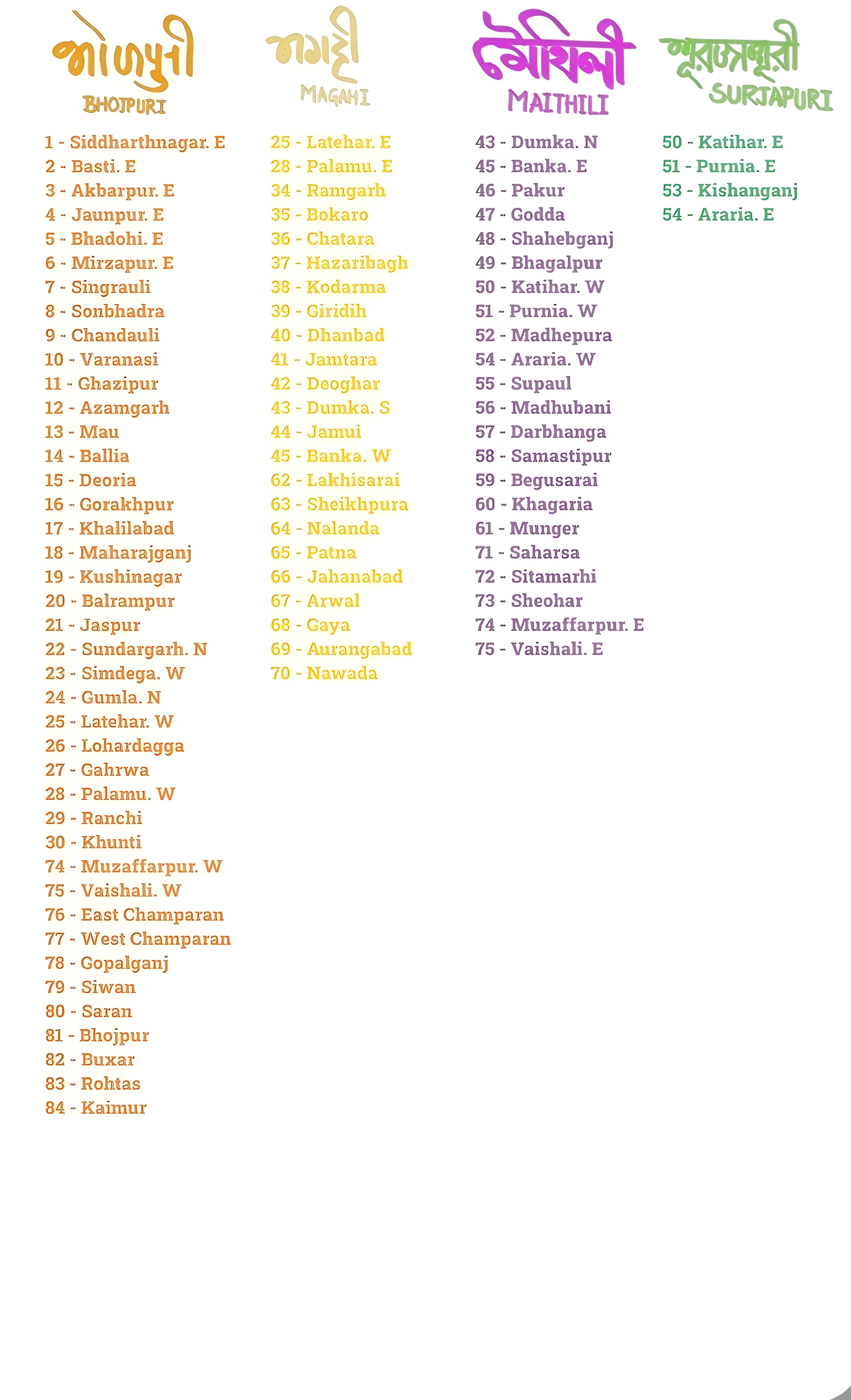
Index of All the Districts having Magadhan Languages as lingua franca. it consists districts of Bihar, East UP (Purwanchal), Jharkhand, Odisha & Madhya Pradesh.

Despite the large number of speakers of these languages, only Maithili has been constitutionally recognised in India. Which gained constitutional status via the 92nd amendment to the Constitution of India, of 2003 (gaining assent in 2004). Maithili and Bhojpuri have constitutional recognition in Nepal. Bhojpuri-Awadhi mix is also official in Fiji as Fiji Hindi. There are demands for including Bhojpuri and Magahi/Khortha in the 8th schedule of Indian constitution.

In Bihar, Hindi is the language used for educational and official matters. These languages were legally absorbed under the overarching label Hindi in the 1961 Census. Such state and national politics are creating conditions for language endangerments. After independence, Hindi was given the sole official status through the Bihar Official Language Act of 1950. Hindi was displaced as the sole official language of Bihar in 1981, when Urdu was accorded the status of the second official language.

== Speakers ==
The number of speakers of Bihari languages is difficult to indicate because of unreliable sources. In the urban region most educated speakers of the language name Hindi as their language because this is what they use in formal contexts and believe it to be the appropriate response because of unawareness. The educated and the urban population of the region return Hindi as the generic name for their language.

British linguist Grierson also mentioned that Bajjika, Angika and Surjapuri are also spoken in particular districts of Bihar. These languages are mostly spoken in rural areas.

== Languages and dialects ==
Language	ISO 639-3	Scripts	No. of speakers	Geographical distribution
Angika	anp	Devanagari; previously Kaithi; Anga Lipi	743,600	Eastern Bihar, North-eastern Jharkhand and Eastern Madhesh of Nepal
Bajjika	–	Devanagari; previously Tirhuta; Kaithi	8,738,000	North-Central Bihar and Eastern Madhesh of Nepal
Bhojpuri	bho	Devanagari; previously Kaithi	52,245,300	Recognized language in Nepal, Official language in Fiji (as the Fiji Hindi) and Jharkhand (additional) In India : Western Bihar, Eastern Uttar Pradesh, Western Jharkhand, Northern Chhattisgarh, Northeastern Madhya Pradesh, Terai region of Central Nepal cite - https://doi.org/10.5281/zenodo.21361541 cite - https://doi.org/10.5281/zenodo.21361541
Khortha	_(sometimes counted under Magahi)	Devanagari; previously Tirhuta	8,040,000	South Bihar, North-eastern and North central Jharkhand
Kudmali (Panchpargania)	kyw, tdb	Devanagari; sometimes Bengali, Kaithi	556,809	South-Eastern Jharkhand, Southern West Bengal, northern Odisha, Assam
Magahi	mag	Devanagari; previously Tirhuta; Kaithi, Siddham script	14,035,600	South Bihar, North Jharkhand and Eastern Madhesh of Nepal
Maithili	mai	Devanagari; previously Tirhuta, Kaithi	33,890,000	Northern and eastern Bihar, Jharkhand and Eastern Madhesh of Nepal
Nagpuri (Sadri)	sck	Devanagari; previously Kaithi	5,100,000	West-central Jharkhand, North-eastern Chhattisgarh, Northwestern Odisha
Tharu	thl, tkt, thr, the, thq, tkb, soi	Devanagari	1,900,000	Terai regions of Nepal and some parts of border side areas of Uttar Pradesh, Uttrakhand and Bihar
Danuwar	dhw	Devanagari	46,000	Nepal
Bote-Darai	bmj, dry	Devanagari	30,000	Nepal
Kumhali	kra	Devanagari	12,000	Nepal
Majhi	mjz	Devanagari	24,000	Nepal
