= Languages with official recognition in India =

Languages designated official status by the Constitution of India

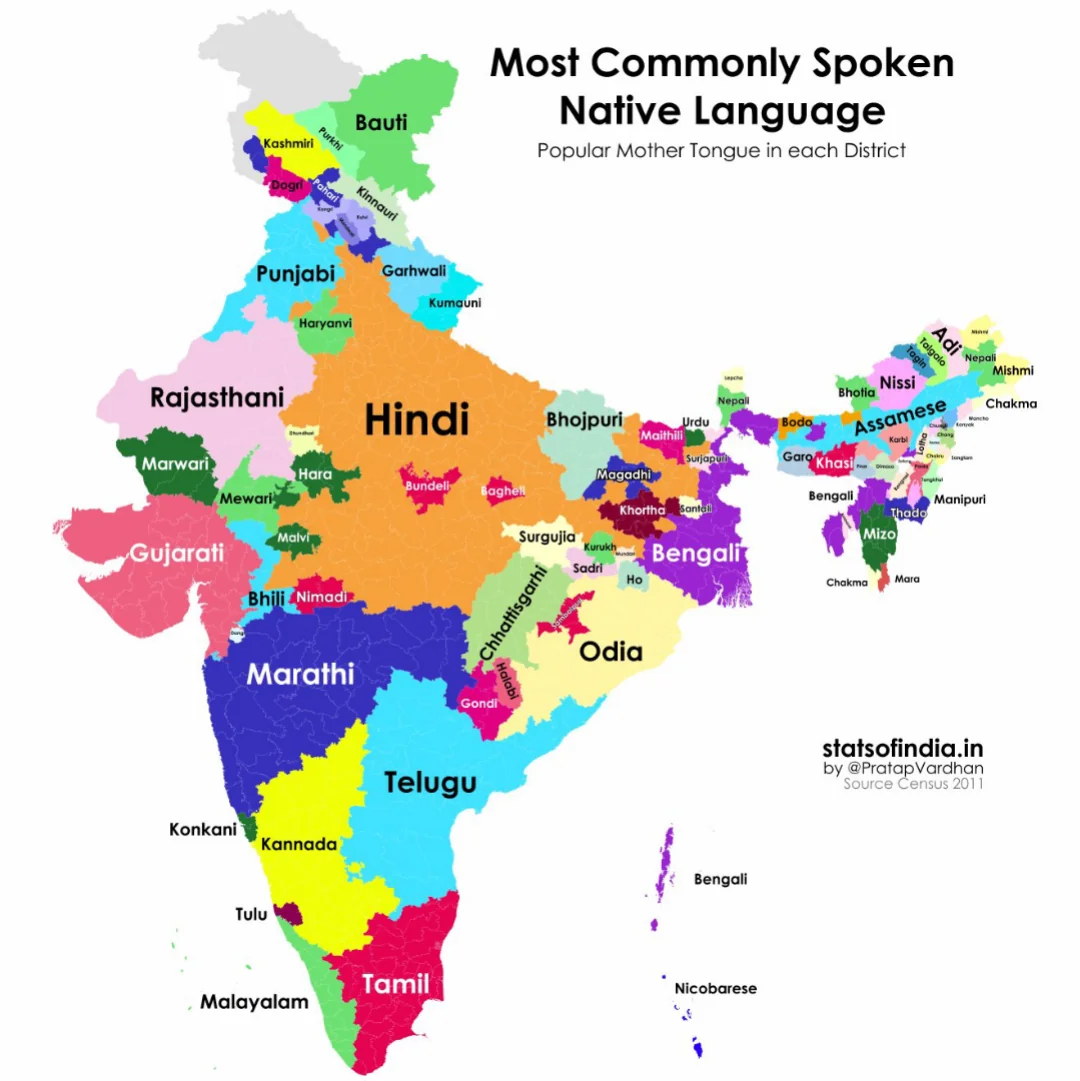
States and union territories of India by the most commonly spoken (L1) first language.

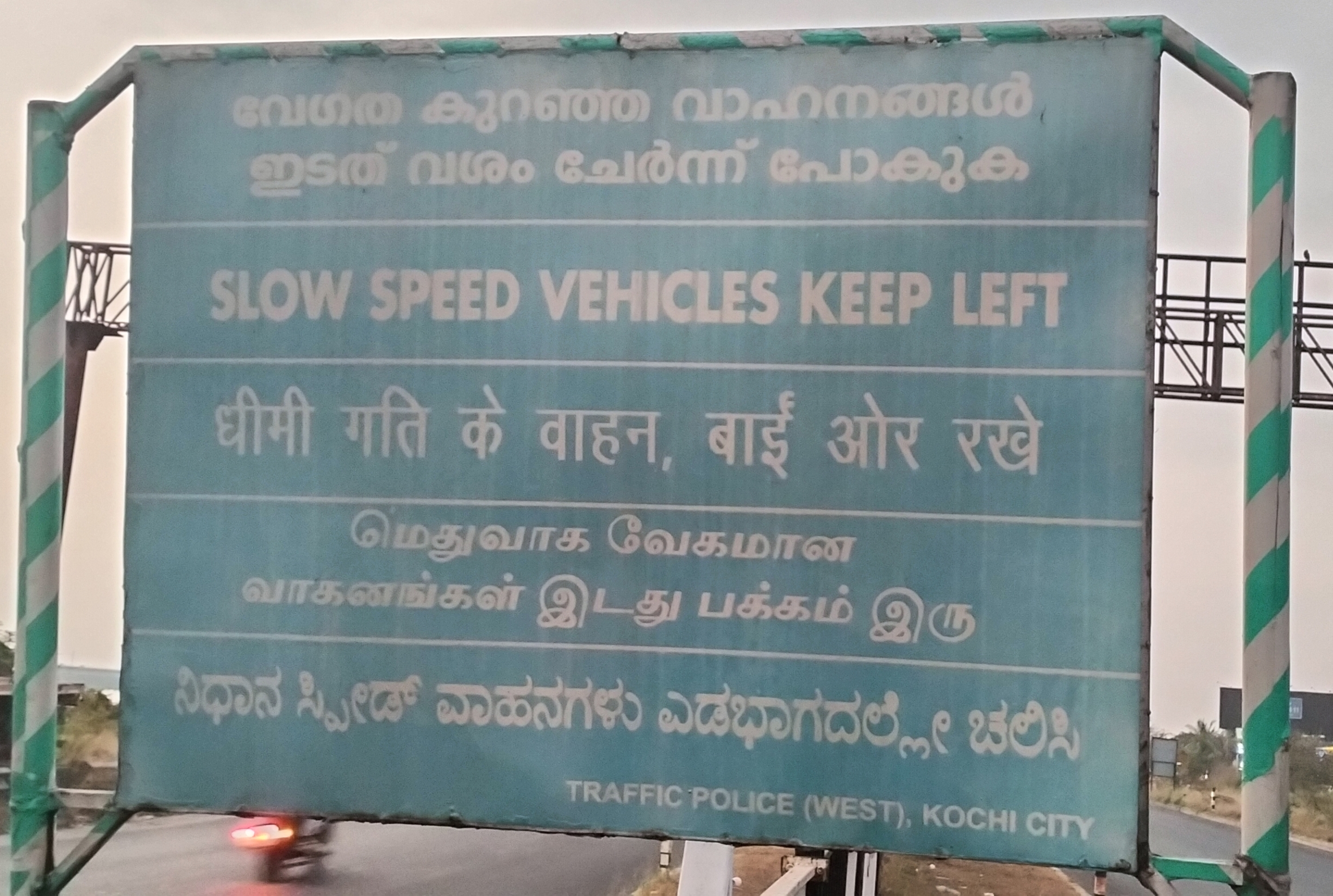
A pentalingual highway sign in Kochi written in Malayalam, English, Hindi, Tamil and Kannada.

As of 2025, 22 languages have been classified as scheduled languages under the Eighth Schedule to the Constitution of India. There is no national language of India, per its constitution. The union government uses Hindi and English for schedule/official works, while state governments and union territories use their respective languages for official works.

When the constitution was adopted in 1950, article 343 declared that Hindi would be the official language and English would serve as an additional official language for a period not exceeding 15 years. Article 344(1) defined a set of 14 regional languages which were represented in the Official Languages Commission. The commission was to suggest steps to be taken to progressively promote the use of Hindi as the official language of the country. The Official Languages Act, 1963, which came into effect on 26 January 1965, made provision for the continuation of English as an official language alongside Hindi.

== History ==
The official languages of British India before independence were English, Hindustani and other Indian vernaculars, with English being used for purposes at the central level. The origins of official Hindi usage traces back to the late 19th century. In 1881, Hindi replaced Urdu as the official language of Bihar; and in 1900, MacDonnell issued an order, which allowed the "permissive — but not exclusive — use" of Devanagari for Hindustani language in the courts of North-Western Provinces.

Following independence, the Constituent Assembly remained divided on the language issue, with some like R. V. Dulekar and Seth Govind Das favouring declaring Hindi written in Devanagari the national language of India immediately, while within the camp favouring Hindi there were divisions over whether the script of the language should be Devanagari or Roman, whether Hindustani with both Devanagari and Urdu scripts be retained, and whether the numerals should be international or Devanagari. Meanwhile, some like Frank Anthony, T A Ramalingam Chettiar, and Naziruddin Ahmad wanted to continue the usage of English, while Nehru, although supporting the dropping of English as an official language in favour of Hindi/Hindustani, cautioned against forcefully doing so in face of opposition in the South. The Indian constitution, adopted in 1950, as a compromise envisaged that English would be phased out in favour of Hindi over a fifteen-year period, but gave Parliament the power to, by law, provide for the continued use of English even thereafter.

Plans to make Hindi the sole official language of the Republic were met with resistance in many parts of the country, especially in Tamil Nadu, which had a history of opposing imposition of the Hindi language dating back to 1937, when the Justice Party opposed the then Congress led Madras Government's decision to make Hindi compulsory in secondary/middle schools.

The Indian constitution, in 1950, declared Hindi in Devanagari script to be the official language of the union. Unless Parliament decided otherwise, the use of English for official purposes was to cease 15 years after the constitution came into effect, that is, on 26 January 1965. The prospect of the changeover, however, led to much alarm in the non-Hindi-speaking areas of India, especially Dravidian-speaking states whose languages were not related to Hindi whatsoever. As a result, Parliament enacted the Official Languages Act, 1963, which provided for the continued use of English for official purposes along with Hindi, even after 1965.

In late 1964, an attempt was made to expressly provide for an end to the use of English, but it was met with protests from states and territories, including Maharashtra, Tamil Nadu, Punjab, West Bengal, Karnataka, Puducherry, Nagaland, Mizoram and Andhra Pradesh. Some of these protests also turned violent. As a result, the proposal was dropped, and the Act itself was amended in 1967 to provide that the use of English would not be ended until a resolution to that effect was passed by the legislature of every state that had not adopted Hindi as its official language, and by each house of the Indian Parliament.

The position was thus that the Union government continues to use English in addition to Hindi for its official purposes as a "subsidiary official language", but is also required to prepare and execute a program to progressively increase its use of Hindi.The exact extent to which, and the areas in which, the Union government uses Hindi and English, respectively, is determined by the provisions of the Constitution, the Official Languages Act, 1963, the Official Languages Rules, 1976, and statutory instruments made by the Department of Official Language under these laws.

Department of Official Language was set up in June 1975 as an independent department of the Ministry of Home Affairs.

== Scheduled languages of the Indian Constitution ==
The Eighth Schedule to the Constitution of the Republic of India lists the official languages of the Republic of India. At the time when the Constitution was enacted, inclusion in this list meant that the language was entitled to representation on the Official Languages Commission, and that the language would be one of the bases that would be drawn upon to enrich Hindi and English, the official languages of the Union. The list has since, however, acquired further significance. The Government of India is now under an obligation to take measures for the development of these languages, such that "they grow rapidly in richness and become effective means of communicating modern knowledge." In addition, candidates sitting for an examination conducted for public service are entitled to use any of these languages as a medium to answer the paper.

=== Chronology ===
- 1950: 14 languages were initially included in the Constitution.
- 1967: Sindhi was added by 21st Constitutional Amendment Act.
- 1992: Konkani, Manipuri and Nepali were added by 71st Constitutional Amendment Act
- 2003: Bodo, Dogri, Maithili and Santali were added by 92nd Constitutional Amendment Act.
- 2011: The spelling Oriya was replaced by Odia by 96th Constitutional Amendment Act.

List of scheduled languages
Language (Note: Includes variants and dialects)	Native Speakers (millions, 2011)	Notes	Year included	Writing system
Assamese	15.3	Official language of Assam	1950	Bengali–Assamese script
Bengali	97.2	Official language of West Bengal, Tripura and the Barak Valley region of Assam, additional official in Jharkhand	1950	Bengali–Assamese script
Bodo	1.48	Official language of Bodoland, Assam.	2003	Devanagari
Dogri	2.6	Official language of Jammu and Kashmir	2003	Devanagari
Gujarati	55.5	Official language in Gujarat and additional official language of Dadra and Nagar Haveli and Daman and Diu	1950	Gujarati script
Hindi	528	Official language in Andaman and Nicobar Islands, Bihar, Dadra and Nagar Haveli and Daman and Diu, Chhattisgarh, Delhi, Gujarat, Haryana, Himachal Pradesh, Jammu and Kashmir, Jharkhand, Ladakh, Madhya Pradesh, Rajasthan, Uttar Pradesh, Uttarakhand. An additional official language in West Bengal Major spoken language in Northern India, and one of the official languages of the Government of India along with English.	1950	Devanagari
Kannada	43.7	Official language of Karnataka	1950	Kannada script
Kashmiri	6.8	Official language of Jammu and Kashmir	1950	Perso-Arabic script
Konkani	2.25	Official language of Goa	1992	Devanagari
Maithili	13.6	Additional official language of Jharkhand	2003	Tirhuta script
Malayalam	34.8	Official language of Kerala; additional official language in Puducherry and Lakshadweep	1950	Malayalam script
Manipuri	1.8	Official language of Manipur	1992	Meitei script
Marathi	83	Official language of Maharashtra; additional official language of Goa.	1950	Devanagari(Balbodh)
Nepali	2.9	Official language of Sikkim. Additional official language in the Gorkhaland region of West Bengal	1992	Devanagari
Odia	37.5	Official language of Odisha; additional official language in Jharkhand, West Bengal The spelling Oriya was replaced by Odia by 96th Constitutional Amendment Act.	1950	Odia script
Punjabi	33.1	Official language of Punjab; additional official language of Delhi, Haryana, West Bengal	1950	Gurmukhi
Sanskrit	0.02	Classical and scriptural language of India, but not widely spoken, nor the language of any modern Indian community. Additional official language of Himachal Pradesh and Uttarakhand.	1950	Devanagari, Brahmi and Brahmic scripts
Santali	7.6	Additional official language of Jharkhand, West Bengal	2003	Ol Chiki
Sindhi	2.7	Not the official language of any state, but spoken by nearly three million Indians, mainly in Gujarat, Maharashtra, Rajasthan, Madhya Pradesh.	1967	Perso-Arabic script or Devanagari
Tamil	69	Official language of Tamil Nadu and Puducherry.	1950	Tamil script
Telugu	81.1	Official language in Andhra Pradesh and Telangana. An additional official language in Puducherry and West Bengal.	1950	Telugu script
Urdu	50.7	An official language of Jammu and Kashmir; an additional official language in Andhra Pradesh, Bihar, Delhi, Jharkhand, Telangana, Uttar Pradesh, and West Bengal.	1950	Perso-Arabic script

== Official languages of the Union ==
The front cover of a contemporary Indian passport, with the national emblem and inscriptions in the two official languages of Hindi and English.

=== Parliamentary proceedings and laws ===
The Indian constitution distinguishes the language to be used in Parliamentary proceedings, and the language in which laws are to be made. Parliamentary business, according to the Constitution, may be conducted in either Hindi or English. The use of English in parliamentary proceedings was to be phased out at the end of fifteen years unless Parliament chose to extend its use, which Parliament did through the Official Languages Act, 1963. Also, the constitution permits a person who is unable to express themself in either Hindi or English to, with the permission of the Speaker of the relevant House, address the House in their mother tongue.

In contrast, the constitution requires the authoritative text of all laws, including Parliamentary enactments and statutory instruments, to be in English, until Parliament decides otherwise. Parliament has not exercised its power to so decide, instead merely requiring that all such laws and instruments, and all bills brought before it, also be translated into Hindi, though the English text remains authoritative. The Official Languages Act, 1963 provides that the authoritative English text of passed acts, rules, regulations, etc., are published in Hindi as well in the official gazette by President of India.

=== Judiciary ===
The constitution provides, and the Supreme Court of India has reiterated, that all proceedings in the Supreme Court and the High Courts shall be in English. Parliament has the power to alter this by law but has not done so. However, in many high courts, there is, with consent from the president, allowance of the optional use of Hindi. Such proposals have been successful in the states of Rajasthan, Madhya Pradesh, Uttar Pradesh, and Bihar.

=== Administration ===
The Official Language Act provides that the Union government shall use both Hindi and English in most administrative documents that are intended for the public, though the Union government is required by law to promote the use of Hindi names, among others, resolutions, general orders, rules, notifications, administrative or other reports or press communiques issued by a government department, agency or corporation; administrative and other reports and official papers laid before a House or the Houses of Parliament; and contracts and agreements executed, and licences, permits, notices and forms of tender issued by or on behalf of the government (including government companies).

The Official Languages Rules, in contrast, provide for a higher degree of use of Hindi in communications between offices of the central government (other than offices in Tamil Nadu, to which the rules do not apply). Communications between different departments within the central government may be in English and Hindi (though the English text remains authoritative), although a translation into the other language must be provided if required. Communications within offices of the same department, however, must be in Hindi if the offices are in Hindi-speaking states, and in either Hindi or English otherwise with Hindi being used in proportion to the percentage of staff in the receiving office who have a working knowledge of Hindi. Notes and memos in files may be in English and Hindi (though the English text remains authoritative), with the Government having a duty to provide a translation into the other language if required.

Besides, every person submitting a petition for the redress of a grievance to a government officer or authority has a constitutional right to submit it in any language used in India.

- 12 out of the 22 scheduled languages are made available in the official website of the Indian Prime Minister's Office, namely Assamese, Bengali, Gujarati, Hindi, Kannada, Malayalam, Marathi, Meitei (Manipuri), Odia, Punjabi, Tamil and Telugu, in addition to English.
- 15 out of the 22 scheduled languages are made available in the Press Information Bureau (PIB) by the Ministry of Information and Broadcasting of the Government of India (GOI), namely Assamese, Bengali, Dogri, Gujarati, Hindi, Kannada, Konkani, Malayalam, Marathi, Meitei (Manipuri), Odia, Punjabi, Tamil, Telugu and Urdu, in addition to English.
- 14 out of the 22 scheduled languages are selected by the Staff Selection Commission (SSC) of the Government of India, to be made available in the conduction of the Multi-Tasking (Non-Technical) Staff examination across the country, namely Assamese, Bengali, Gujarati, Hindi, Kannada, Konkani, Malayalam, Marathi, Meitei (Manipuri), Odia, Punjabi, Tamil, Telugu and Urdu, in addition to English.

=== Implementation ===
Various steps have been taken by the Indian government to implement the use and familiarisation of Hindi extensively. Dakshina Bharat Hindi Prachar Sabha headquartered at Chennai was formed to spread Hindi in South Indian states. Regional Hindi implementation offices at Bangalore, Thiruvananthapuram, Mumbai, Kolkata, Guwahati, Bhopal, Delhi and Ghaziabad have been established to monitor the implementation of Hindi in Central government offices and PSUs.

Annual targets are set by the Department of Official Language regarding the amount of correspondence being carried out in Hindi. A Parliament Committee on Official Language constituted in 1976 periodically reviews the progress in the use of Hindi and submits a report to the President. The governmental body which makes policy decisions and established guidelines for the promotion of Hindi is the Kendriya Hindi Samiti (est. 1967). In every city that has more than ten central Government offices, a Town Official Language Implementation Committee is established and cash awards are given to government employees who write books in Hindi. All Central government offices and PSUs are to establish Hindi Cells for implementation of Hindi in their offices.

In 2016, the government announced plans to promote Hindi in government offices in Southern and Northeast India.

The Indian constitution does not specify the official languages to be used by the states for the conduct of their official functions and leaves each state free to, through its legislature, adopt Hindi or any language used in its territory as its official language or languages. The language need not be one of those listed in the Eighth Schedule, and several states have adopted official languages which are not so listed. Examples include Kokborok in Tripura and Mizo in Mizoram.

=== Legislature and administration ===
The constitutional provisions in relation to use of the official language in legislation at the State level largely mirror those relating to the official language at the central level, with minor variations. State legislatures may conduct their business in their official language, Hindi or (for a transitional period, which the legislature can extend if it so chooses) English, and members who cannot use any of these have the same rights to their mother tongue with the Speaker's permission. The authoritative text of all laws must be in English unless Parliament passes a law permitting a state to use another language, and if the original text of a law is in a different language, an authoritative English translation of all laws must be prepared.

The state has the right to regulate the use of its official language in public administration, and in general, neither the constitution nor any central enactment imposes any restriction on this right. However, every person submitting a petition for the redress of a grievance to any officer or authority of the state government has a constitutional right to submit it in any language used in that state, regardless of its official status.

Besides, the constitution grants the central government, acting through the President, the power to issue certain directives to the government of a state in relation to the use of minority languages for official purposes. The President may direct a State to officially recognise a language spoken in its territory for specified purposes and in specified regions if its speakers demand it and satisfy him that a substantial proportion of the State's population desires its use. Similarly, States and local authorities are required to endeavour to provide primary education in the mother tongue for all linguistic minorities, regardless of whether their language is official in that State, and the President has the power to issue directions he deems necessary to ensure that they are provided these facilities.

=== State judiciary ===
States have significantly less freedom in relation to determining the language in which judicial proceedings in their respective High Courts will be conducted. The constitution gives the power to authorise the use of Hindi, or the state's official language in proceedings of the High Court to the Governor, rather than the state legislature and requires the Governor to obtain the consent of the President of India, who in these matters acts on the advice of the Government of India. The Official Languages Act gives the Governor a similar power, subject to similar conditions, in relation to the language in which the High Court's judgements will be delivered.

Four states—Bihar, Uttar Pradesh, Madhya Pradesh and Rajasthan— have been granted the right to conduct proceedings in their High Courts in their official language, which, for all of them, was Hindi. However, the only non-Hindi state to seek a similar power—Tamil Nadu, which sought the right to conduct proceedings in Tamil in the Madras High Court—had its application rejected by the central government earlier, which said it was advised to do so by the Supreme Court. In 2006, the law ministry said that it would not object to Tamil Nadu state's desire to conduct Madras High Court proceedings in Tamil. In 2010, the Chief Justice of the Madras High Court allowed lawyers to argue cases in Tamil.

=== Demands for additional official languages ===
At present, as per the Ministry of Home Affairs, there are demands for inclusion of 38 more languages in the Eighth Schedule to the Constitution. These are:

- Angika
- Banjara
- Bajjika
- Bhojpuri
- Bundelkhandi
- Chhattisgarhi
- Dhatki
- English
- Garhwali
- Gondi
- Gujjari
- Ho
- Kachhi
- Kamtapuri
- Karbi
- Khasi
- Kodava
- Kokborok
- Kumaoni
- Kurukh
- Kurmali
- Ladakhi
- Lepcha
- Limbu
- Mizo
- Magahi
- Mundari
- Nagpuri
- Nicobarese
- Himachali
- Pali
- Rajasthani
- Saraiki
- Sambalpuri
- Shauraseni Prakrit
- Sikkimese
- Tenyidie
- Tulu

== Official status in states and territories ==
=== Official languages of states ===
In addition to official languages, a few states also designate official scripts.

State	Official language(s)	Additional official language(s)	Mandated scripts
Andhra Pradesh	Telugu	English, Urdu	
Arunachal Pradesh	English		
Assam	Assamese and Bodo	Bengali in three districts of Barak Valley	Bodo is officially written in the Devanagari script.
Bihar	Hindi	Urdu	
Chhattisgarh	Hindi, Chhattisgarhi		Devanagari
Goa	Konkani, English	Marathi	
Gujarat	Gujarati	Hindi	
Haryana	Hindi	English, Punjabi	Hindi should be written in Devanagari. Punjabi should be written in Gurmukhi.
Himachal Pradesh	Hindi	Sanskrit	Both Hindi and Sanskrit are written in Devanagari.
Jharkhand	Hindi	Angika, Bengali, Bhojpuri, Bhumij, Ho, Kharia, Khortha, Kurmali, Kurukh, Magahi, Maithili, Mundari, Nagpuri, Odia, Santali, Urdu	
Karnataka	Kannada	Tulu	
Kerala	Malayalam		
Madhya Pradesh	Hindi		
Maharashtra	Marathi		Devanagari
Manipur	Manipuri	English	Meetei mayek
Meghalaya	English, Khasi and Garo		
Mizoram	Mizo, English		
Nagaland	English		
Odisha	Odia	English	
Punjab	Punjabi		Gurmukhi
Rajasthan	Hindi		
Sikkim	English, Nepali	Bhutia, Gurung, Lepcha, Limbu, Magar, Mukhia, Newari, Rai, Sherpa, and Tamang	
Tamil Nadu	Tamil	English	
Telangana	Telugu	Urdu	
Tripura	Bengali, English, Kokborok		
Uttar Pradesh	Hindi	Urdu	
Uttarakhand	Hindi	Sanskrit	
West Bengal	Bengali, English	Nepali in Darjeeling and Kurseong sub-divisions; Urdu, Hindi, Odia, Santali, Punjabi, Kamtapuri, Rajbanshi, Kudmali/Kurmali, Kurukh and Telugu in blocks, divisions or districts with population greater than 10 per cent	

=== Official languages of Union Territories ===
Union territory	Official language(s)	Additional official language(s)
Andaman and Nicobar Islands	Hindi, English	
Dadra and Nagar Haveli and Daman and Diu	Hindi, English	Gujarati
Delhi	Hindi, English	Urdu, Punjabi
Chandigarh	Hindi, English	
Ladakh	Ladakhi, Purgi, Urdu, Hindi, English	
Lakshadweep	English	Malayalam
Jammu and Kashmir	Kashmiri, Dogri, Hindi, Urdu, English	
Puducherry	Tamil (in Pondicherry and Karaikal), Telugu (in Yanam), Malayalam (in Mahe) (Note: See Official languages of Puducherry)	English, French

== Union–state and interstate communication rules ==
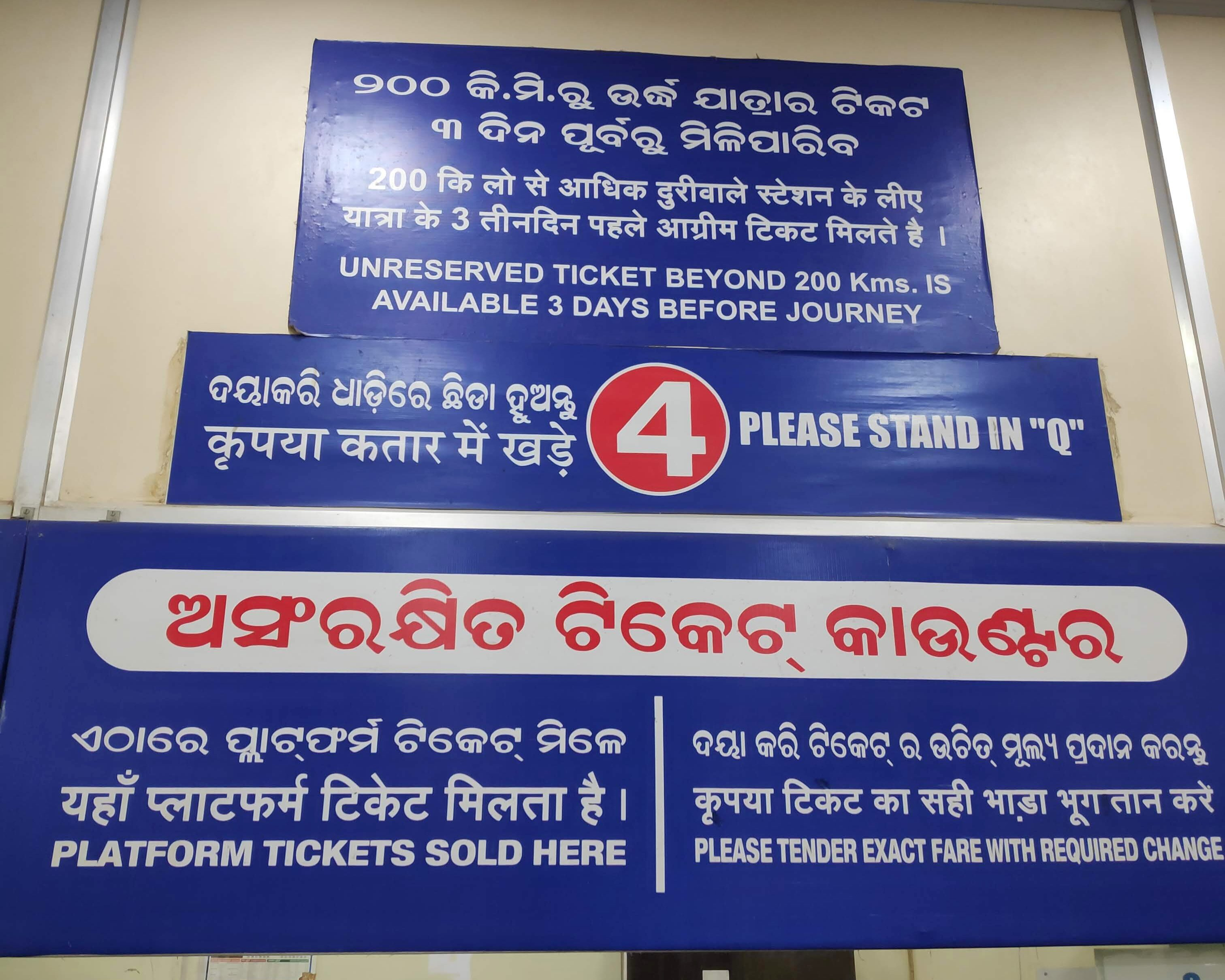
In places like railway stations, signboards are usually written in three languages - the state language (here Odia) and the two official languages Hindi and English.

The language of communications between different states or between the union government and a state or a person in a state, is regulated by the Official Languages Act and, except for communications involving Tamil Nadu, which are governed by the Official Languages Rules. Communication between states which have Hindi as an official language must be in Hindi, whereas communication between a state where Hindi is an official language and one where it is not Hindi and must be in English, or, in Hindi with an accompanying English translation (unless the receiving state agrees to dispense with the translation).

Communication between the union and states which use Hindi as their official language (classified by the Official Language Rules as "the states in Region A"), and with persons who live in those states, is generally in Hindi, except in certain cases. Communication with a second category of states "Region B", which do not have Hindi as an official language but have elected to communicate with the union in Hindi is usually in Hindi, while communications sent to an individual in those states may be in Hindi and English. Communication with all other states "Region C", and with people living in them, is in English.

Region	States/Union Territories	Communication
Region A	Andaman and Nicobar Islands, Bihar, Chhattisgarh, Delhi, Haryana, Himachal Pradesh, Jharkhand, Madhya Pradesh, Rajasthan, Uttarakhand, Uttar Pradesh	Hindi
Region B	Chandigarh, Dadra and Nagar Haveli and Daman and Diu, Gujarat, Maharashtra, Punjab	Hindi or English
Region C	Andhra Pradesh, Arunachal Pradesh, Assam, Goa, Jammu and Kashmir, Karnataka, Kerala, Ladakh, Lakshadweep, Manipur, Meghalaya, Mizoram, Nagaland, Odisha, Puducherry, Sikkim, Tamil Nadu, Telangana, Tripura, West Bengal	English

== Arts and literature ==
- Best Feature Film in any of the scheduled languages are eligible for the National Film Awards. (Note: In certain years, films of languages other than the scheduled languages also get eligible.)
- Literary works in any of the scheduled languages are eligible for the Sahitya Akademi Awards, the Sahitya Akademi Translation Prizes and the Sahitya Akademi Yuva Puraskar.
- People who contribute to the literature of any of the scheduled languages are eligible for the Sahitya Akademi Fellowship.
- Literary works in any of the scheduled languages are eligible for the Gyanpeeth Awards.
- Prose or poetry literary works in any of the scheduled languages are eligible for the Saraswati Samman, the highest among all the literary awards in India.
- Writers who contribute to the literature of any of the scheduled languages are eligible for the Bhasha Samman Awards.

== See also ==
- Languages of India
- List of languages by number of native speakers in India
- Indian states by most spoken scheduled languages
- The Eighth Schedule to the Indian Constitution
