= Santpur =

Place in Narayani Zone, Nepal

Coordinates: 27°5′N 85°21′E

Santipur सान्तपुर
- Interactive map of Santipur
- Country: Nepal
- Zone: Narayani Zone
- Districts of Nepal: Rautahat District

Population (1991)
  - Total: 5,594
- Time zone: UTC+5:45 (Nepal Time)

Santpur is a town and market center in Chandrapur Municipality in Rautahat District in the Narayani Zone of south-eastern Nepal. The formerly village development committee was merged to form the municipality on 18 May 2014. At the time of the 1991 Nepal census it had a population of 5594.
