= Seventy-first Amendment of the Constitution of India =

Added three new languages as official languages of India

The Constitution (Seventy-first Amendment) Act, 1992

Parliament of India
- Long title: An Act further to amend the Constitution of India.
- Citation: 71st Amendment
- Territorial extent: India
- Passed by: Lok Sabha
- Passed: 20 August 1992
- Passed by: Rajya Sabha
- Passed: 20 August 1992
- Assented to: 31 August 1992
- Commenced: 31 August 1992

Legislative history

Initiating chamber: Lok Sabha
- Bill title: Constitution (Seventy-eighth Amendment) Bill, 1992
- Introduced by: Shankarrao Chavan
- Introduced: 20 August 1992

Related legislation
- 21st and 92nd Amendments

Summary
- Included Konkani, Meitei (officially called Manipuri) and Nepali as official languages by amending the Eighth Schedule to the Constitution
- Status: In force

The Seventy-first Amendment of the Constitution of India, officially known as The Constitution (Seventy-first Amendment) Act, 1992, amended the Eighth Schedule to the Constitution so as to include Konkani, Meitei (officially called "Manipuri") and Nepali languages, thereby raising the total number of languages listed in the schedule to eighteen. The Eighth Schedule lists languages that the Government of India has the responsibility to develop.

The Eighth Schedule to the Constitution originally included 14 languages. Sindhi was included by the 21st Amendment, enacted in 1967. Bodo, Dogri, Santhali and Maithili were included in the Eighth Schedule in 2004, through the 92nd Amendment, raising the total number of languages to 22.

== Text ==
BE it enacted by Parliament in the Forty-third Year of the Republic of India as follows:—

1. Short title This Act may be called the Constitution (Seventy-first Amendment) Act, 1992.

2. Amendment of Eighth Schedule In the Eighth Schedule to the Constitution—

(a) existing entry 7 shall be re-numbered as entry 8, and before entry 8 as so re-numbered, the entry "7. Konkani." shall be inserted;
(b) existing entry 8 shall be re-numbered as entry 10, and before entry 10 as so re-numbered, the entry "9. Manipuri." shall be inserted;
(c) existing entries 9 to 15 shall be re-numbered as entries 12 to 18 respectively, and before entry 12 as so re-numbered, the entry "11. Nepali." shall be inserted.

== Proposal and enactment ==
The Constitution (Seventy-first Amendment) Act, 1992, was introduced in Lok Sabha on 20 August 1992, as the Constitution (Seventy-eighth Amendment) Bill, 1992 (Bill No. 142 of 1992). It was introduced by Shankarrao Chavan, then Minister of Home Affairs, and sought to include Konkani, Meitei and Nepali languages in the Eighth Schedule of the Constitution. The full text of the Statement of Objects and Reasons appended to the bill is given below:

There have been demands for inclusion of certain languages in the Eighth Schedule to the Constitution. It is proposed to include Konkani, Manipuri and Nepali languages in the Eighth Schedule to the Constitution. The Bill seeks to give effect to this decision.

2. The Nepali language is also known in some areas as "Gorkha Bhasa". In the Census operations, other nomenclatures such as "Gorkhali", "Gorkdhi", "Gurkhiya", "Khaskura" or "Naipali" have also been used.

— S.B. Chavan, "The Constitution (Seventy-eighth Amendment) Bill, 1992". This article incorporates text from this source, which is in the public domain.

The Bill was debated by the Lok Sabha on 20 August 1992 and, as amended, passed on the same day. Clause 1 of the Bill was adopted by the Lok Sabha with a formal amendment replacing the word "Seventy-eighth" by the word "Seventy-first". The Bill, as passed by the Lok Sabha, was considered and passed by the Rajya Sabha on 20 August 1992. The bill received assent from then President Shankar Dayal Sharma on 31 August 1992, and came into force on the same date. It was notified in The Gazette of India on 1 September 1992.

== See also ==
- List of amendments of the Constitution of India
