= Official Languages Act, 1963 =

Act of the Parliament of India

Parliament of India
- Long title: An Act to provide for the languages which may be used for the official purposes of the Union, for transaction of business in Parliament, for Central and State Acts and for certain purposes in High Courts.
- Citation: Act No. 19 of 1963
- Passed by: Lok Sabha
- Passed: 27 April 1963
- Passed by: Rajya Sabha
- Passed: 7 May 1963
- Assented to by: President Sarvepalli Radhakrishnan
- Assented to: 10 May 1963
- Commenced: 10 January 1965, section 5(1); 26 January 1965, section 3; 19 May 1969, section 6; 7 March 1970, section 7; 1 October 1976, section 5(2)

Legislative history

Initiating chamber: Lok Sabha
- Bill title: Official Languages Bill,1963
- Introduced by: Home Minister Lal Bahadur Shastri
- Introduced: 23 April 1963
- Third reading: 27 April 1963
- Voting summary: 188 voted for; 15 voted against

Revising chamber: Rajya Sabha
- Passed: 7 May 1963

Amended by
- Official Languages (Amendment) Act, 1967 (1 of 1968); Delegated Legislation Provisions (Amendment) Act, 1985 (4 of 1986)
- Status: In force

The Official Languages Act, 1963 is an act of the Parliament of India which designates which of the official languages of India are the language of government.

== History ==
The act was passed to pre-empt protests in certain southern states, such as Tamil Nadu, where there was significant opposition to the "imposition" of Hindi.

In late 1964, an attempt was made to expressly provide for an end to the use of English, but it was met with protests from states and territories, including Maharashtra, Tamil Nadu, Punjab, West Bengal, Karnataka, Puducherry, Nagaland, Mizoram and Andhra Pradesh. Some of these protests also turned violent. As a result, the proposal was dropped, and the Act itself was amended in 1967 under the Indira Gandhi administration to provide that the use of English would not be ended until a resolution to that effect was passed by the legislature of every state that had not adopted Hindi as its official language, and by each house of the Indian Parliament.

On 18 January 1968, the Official Language Resolution was passed by the Parliament of India which further mandated the development and promotion of all the languages listed in the Eighth Schedule. As per the resolution, the Government of India was obligated to take measures for the development of the languages defined in the eighth schedule.

== Provision ==
The act provide for the languages which might be used for the official purposes of the union. The act effectively made English a permanent official language of India, notwithstanding the constitution limiting this to the 15 years after 1950. The act effectively made the government of India bilingual.

The act establishes the Parliamentary Committee on Official Language and section 4 of the act states that its remit is to review the progress made in using Hindi for the official purposes of Union and submit a report.

== See also ==
- Languages of India
  - Languages with official recognition in India
