= Bote-Darai language =

Language of Nepal

Bote-Darai
- Native to: Nepal
- Ethnicity: Darai and Bote people
- Native speakers: 20,000 (2011 census)
- Language family: Indo-European: Indo-Iranian; Indo-Aryan; Eastern Zone (Magadhan); Bihari; (unclassified); Kuswaric; Bote-Darai

Language codes
- ISO 639-3: Either: bmj – Bote-Majhi dry – Darai
- Glottolog: bote1238 Bote dara1250 Darai

Bote (Bote-Majhi) and Darai are mutually intelligible tribal dialects of Nepal that are close to Danwar Rai and Tharu languages but otherwise unclassified. Its speakers are rapidly shifting to Nepali.
