= Bharatiya Bhasha Anubhag =

Indian language platform

Bharatiya Bhasha Anubhag (BBA) or Indian Languages Section is a platform established by the Ministry of Education and Government of India, to promote and preserve India's linguistic heritage.

== Description ==
It supports and enhance the use of regional languages in education and administration. The division operates in accordance with the National Education Policy 2020, which stresses the importance of learning in the mother tongue. The Bharatiya Bhasha Samiti is one of the organizations it collaborates with to create multilingual academic resources. The Anubhag makes it easier to translate and publish educational materials in various Indian languages. The division is involved in implementing policies related to language education.
