= Majhi people =

Majhi people of Nepal

माझी
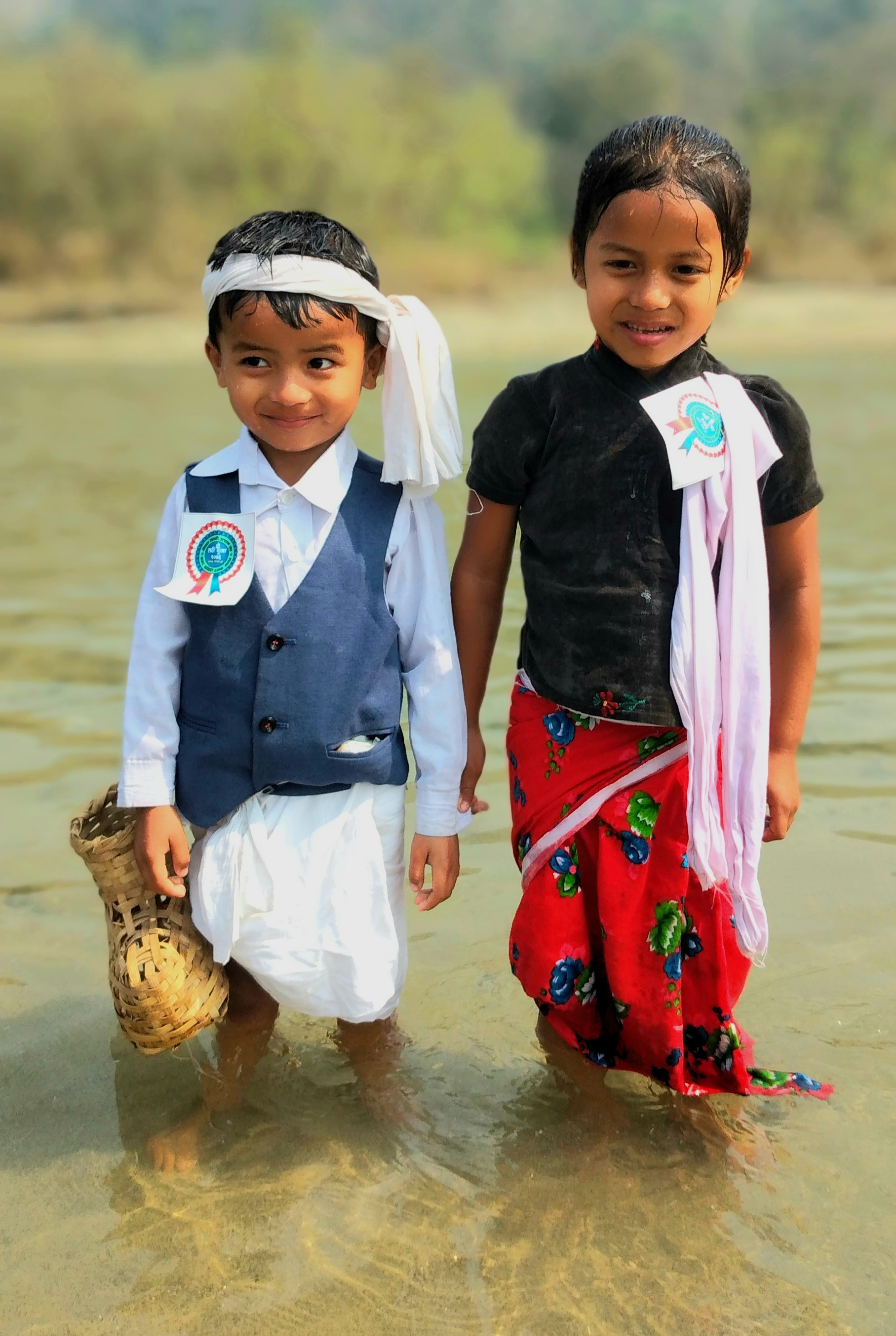
- Boy and Girl in Majhi Cultural Dress

Total population
- Nepal 111,352

Languages
- Majhi language, Nepali

Religion
- Hinduism 82%, Prakriti 16%, Christianity 1.33%

Related ethnic groups
- Tharu people, Danuwar, Darai, Bote

The Majhi people are an ethnic group indigenous to the inner Terai regions of Nepal. They live on the banks of rivers and streams, fishing, boating, making chillies, and make a living by farming. They speak Majhi language.The territories of Majhi people include hilly and inner Terai regions along the tributaries of Saptakoshi river like Sunkoshi, Tamakoshi, Dudhkoshi, Arun, Barun, Likhu, and Tamur. They have their own distinct language, religion, culture, rituals, custom and lifestyles. The Majhis belongs to the most marginalized group.

== Origin ==
The word Majhi means fishermen in Nepali. The present day Majhi narrate multiple stories and beliefs about the origin of their ethnic group. Many older Majhi from Sindhuli and Ramechap districts are of the view that Majhi are descendants of the people related with the Hindu epics such as the Ramayana.

== Culture ==
Majhi people live alongside the rivers of Nepal with ancestral occupations of boating and fishing. Their distinct folklore, songs, and dances often celebrate the beauty and power of the rivers. The community's traditional wooden boats, known as "dohis," have become emblematic of their way of life. For generations, the Majhi community has played a pivotal role in facilitating transportation and trade, ferrying people, goods, and livestock across Nepal's rivers. There’s similarity in custom and occupation of Bote or Majhi people though they live in different places of Nepal. Living besides river, fishing boating, looking for gold, farming and rearing animals are the main occupations of these people. They have different tradition of birth, death, wedding, feast and festivals from other races.

== Language ==
Majhi people speak Majhi language (also known as Majhi Kuro or Majhi Bhasa) which is spoken in central and eastern Nepal. According to the census of 2011, there were a total of 24,000 who considered Majhi as their mother tongue. There are some regional dialects of the Majhi language. There are some differences in each district and village.

== Religion ==
Majhi people consider themselves as Nature worshippers. Though Majhis do not employ Brahmin priest while performing religious rites, they claim themselves to be Hindu. They observe all such festivals as Baisakh Purnima, Sansari Puja, Aitabare, Shrawan Sankranti, Dashain, Tihar, Godhko dhup, Maghe Sankranti and Chaite Dasain. Additionally, they also offer sacrifice (Panchabali) to gods and celebrate Barden and Bhumi Puja (land-worship), Jhakani Puja to name a few.

== Marriage ==
The Majhi follow different kinds of marriage system, love marriage and arranged marriage.
