= Ghumaune Ghar =

Traditional type of house in Nepal

Ghumaune Ghar (also called Gol ghar or Batule Ghar) is a traditional house constructed by the Darai People in western Nepal. The architecture adhere to the Bastu sastra. The house has a cylindrical shape due to which the sunshine all day long in these types of house. The house has two floors. The ground floor consists of four rooms. One is used as kitchen, two as bedrooms and one is used to store farming instruments. The upper floor is used to store agriculture products from the farm. The house is constructed around a central wooden post with stone masonry. The post also supports the thatched roof. It is believed that these structures are resilient against earthquake.
