= Twenty-first Amendment of the Constitution of India =

Added Sindhi to the list of official languages of India

The Constitution (Twenty-first Amendment) Act, 1967

Parliament of India
- Long title: An Act further to amend the Constitution of India.
- Citation: 21st Amendment
- Territorial extent: India
- Passed by: Rajya Sabha
- Passed: 4 April 1967
- Passed by: Lok Sabha
- Passed: 7 April 1967
- Assented to: 10 April 1967
- Commenced: 10 April 1967

Legislative history

Initiating chamber: Rajya Sabha
- Bill title: Constitution (Twenty-first Amendment) Bill, 1967
- Introduced by: Yashwantrao Chavan
- Introduced: 20 March 1967

Related legislation
- 71st and 92nd Amendments

Summary
- Included Sindhi as an official language by amending the Eighth Schedule to the Constitution
- Status: In force

The Twenty-first Amendment of the Constitution of India, officially known as The Constitution (Twenty-first Amendment) Act, 1967, amended the Eighth Schedule to the Constitution so as to include Sindhi as one of the languages, thereby raising the total number of languages listed in the schedule to fifteen. The Eighth Schedule lists languages that the Government of India has the responsibility to develop.

The Eighth Schedule to the Constitution originally included 14 languages. The 71st Amendment, enacted in 1992, included three more languages, i.e. Konkani, Meitei (Manipuri) and Nepali. The 92nd Amendment, added Bodo, Dogri, Santhali and Maithali in 2003, raising the total number of languages to 22.

== Text ==
BE it enacted by Parliament in the Eighteenth Year of the Republic of India as follows:—

1. Short title This Act may be called the Constitution (Twenty-first Amendment) Act, 1967.

2. Amendment of Eighth Schedule In the Eighth Schedule to the Constitution—

(a) entries 12 to 14, shall be re-numbered as entries 13 to 15 respectively, and
(b) before entry "13" as so re-numbered, the entry "12. Sindhi". shall be inserted.

== Proposal and enactment ==
The Constitution (Twenty-first Amendment) Bill, 1967 (Bill No. 1 of 1967) was introduced in the Rajya Sabha on 20 March 1967. It was introduced by Yashwantrao Chavan, then Minister of Home Affairs, and sought to amend the Eighth Schedule to the Constitution to include Sindhi as one of the languages listed in the schedule. The full text of the Statement of Objects and Reasons appended to the bill is given below:

There have been persistent demands from the Sindhi-speaking people for the inclusion of the Sindhi language in the Eighth Schedule to the Constitution. Although at present Sindhi is not a regional language in a well-defined area, it used to be the language of a province of the undivided India and, but for partition, would have continued to be so. The Commissioner for Linguistic Minorities has also recommended the inclusion of Sindhi in the Eighth Schedule to the Constitution. On 4 November 1966, it was announced that Government had decided to include the Sindhi language in the Eighth Schedule to the Constitution. The Bill seeks to give effect to this decision.

— Y.B. Chavan, "The Constitution (Twenty-second Amendment) Bill, 1966".

The Bill was considered by the Rajya Sabha on 4 April 1967 and passed in the original form on the same day. The Bill, as passed by the Rajya Sabha, was considered and passed by the Lok Sabha on 7 April 1967. The bill received assent from then President Zakir Husain on 10 April 1967. It was notified in The Gazette of India and came into force on the same date.

== See also ==
- List of amendments of the Constitution of India
