= Darai people =

Inindigenous ethnic community in Nepal

Total population
- 18,695

Regions with significant populations
- Nepal, India

Languages
- Darai language, Nepali

Religion
- Hinduism 95%, Christianity 2.51%, Prakriti 2.2%

Related ethnic groups
- Tamang, Chaudhary

Darai people (Nepali: दराई जाति) are an indigenous ethnic tribal community native to Nepal. Most of their population live in hills and inner terai of Nepal in the banks of Narayani river with the largest concentration in Tanahu, Chitwan, Gorkha and Nawalparasi districts. They are known as Daroe, Darhi, Daraie, Daras, Darad and Darai. According to census of 2021 their population is 18,695.

== Culture and language ==
The Darai speak the Darai language, which is closely related to Danwar Rai. It is mutually intelligible with Bote (Bote-Majhi).

Darai people follow Hinduism and celebrate festivals such as Tihar (Sohorai), Jarmathi, Teej, Amawsha, Badkibhat, Faguwa, Ghata Naach, and Dashain. Their dress is similar to Magar and Gurung dress but their language is what differentiates them from others. In their appearance, attitudes and behavior they are much different from them.

Darai people use earthen pots for daily works, such as carrying water and preparing alcoholic drinks. They use limited metal tools made of iron, bronze, copper and aluminium. They also build a distinct house called Ghumaune Ghar.

== Origin ==
There are various theories on the origin of the Darai people. Their endonym Darai is a derivative of Dharroo, which translates to 'physically strong'. People from ancient Tanahu used to go to Saranghat (an ancient place in Nawalparasi) for shopping purposes, mainly for salt. On the way, boatmen (now called Bote) used to help them cross the Madi and Buldi rivers. Once, during monsoon season when there were not any boats, a man with a heavy bag of salt from Saranghat tried to cross the river himself but was overcome by the flooded river. They are believed to be the inhabitants of Terai region in the banks of Narayani river since several thousand years. The next theory is that Prithvi Narayan Shah divided the Karnali region into various daras, which is the origin of the word Darai, and which is also mentioned in the Mahabharat, Manusmriti, and the Haribanshapurana.
