= Ninety-second Amendment of the Constitution of India =

Added four new languages as official languages of India

The Constitution (Ninety-second Amendment) Act, 2003

Parliament of India
- Long title: An Act further to amend the Constitution of India.
- Citation: ANNEXURE (A) TEXTS OF THE CONSTITUTION AMENDMENT ACTS (First to Ninety-fourth)
- Territorial extent: India
- Passed by: Lok Sabha
- Passed: 22 December 2003
- Passed by: Rajya Sabha
- Passed: 23 December 2003
- Assented to: 7 January 2004
- Commenced: 7 January 2004

Legislative history

Initiating chamber: Lok Sabha
- Bill title: Constitution (One-hundredth Amendment) Bill, 2003
- Introduced by: Lal Krishna Advani
- Introduced: 18 August 2003
- Committee report: Report of the Standing Committee on Home Affairs

Final stages
- Reported from conference committee: 5 December 2003

Related legislation
- 21st and 71st Amendments

Summary
- Included Bodo, Dogri, Maithili and Santali as official languages by amending the Eighth Schedule to the Constitution
- Status: In force

The Ninety-second Amendment of the Constitution of India, officially known as The Constitution (Ninety-second Amendment) Act, 2003, amended the Eighth Schedule to the Constitution so as to include Bodo, Dogri, Maithili and Santali languages, thereby raising the total number of languages listed in the schedule to 22. The Eighth Schedule lists languages that the Government of India has the responsibility to develop.

The Eighth Schedule to the Constitution originally included 14 languages. Sindhi was included by the 21st Amendment, enacted in 1967; and Konkani, Meitei and Nepali were included by the 71st Amendment in 1992, raising the total number of languages to 18.

== Text ==
BE it enacted by Parliament in the Fifty-fourth year of the Republic of India as follows:—

1. Short title This Act may be called the Constitution (Ninety-second Amendment) Act, 2003.

2. Amendment of Eighth Schedule In the Eighth Schedule to the Constitution—

(a) existing entry 3 shall be re-numbered as entry 5, and before entry 5 as so re-numbered, the following entries shall be inserted, namely:—

"3. Bodo.
4. Dogri.";

(b) existing entries 4 to 7 shall respectively be re-numbered as entries 6 to 9;
(c) existing entry 8 shall be re-numbered as entry 11 and before entry 11 as so re-numbered, the following entry shall be inserted, namely:—

"10. Maithili."

(d) existing entries 9 to 14 shall respectively be re-numbered as entries 12 to 17;
(e) existing entry 15 shall be re-numbered as entry 19 and before entry 19 as so re-numbered, the following entry shall be inserted, namely:—

"18. Santali."

(f) existing entries 16 to 18 shall respectively be re-numbered as entries 20 to 22.

== Proposal and enactment ==
The Constitution (Ninety-second Amendment) Act, 2003, was introduced in the Lok Sabha on 18 August 2003, as the Constitution (One-hundredth Amendment) Bill, 2003 (Bill No. 63 of 2003). It was introduced by then Deputy Prime Minister Lal Krishna Advani and sought to amend the Eighth Schedule to the Constitution. The full text of the Statement of Objects and Reasons appended to the bill is given below:

There have been demands for inclusion of certain languages in the Eighth Schedule to the Constitution. It is proposed to include Bodo language in the Eighth Schedule to the Constitution.

2. The Bill seeks to achieve the above object.

— L.K. Advani, "The Constitution (One-hundredth Amendment) Bill, 2003".

The bill, as introduced, was referred to the Standing Committee on Home Affairs, which presented its report to the Rajya Sabha, recommending that the Bill be passed in the present form. The Report was laid on the table of the Lok Sabha on 5 December 2003. The Bill was debated by the Lok Sabha on 22 December 2003 and passed on the same day, with a formal amendment changing the short title from "One-hundredth" to "Ninety-second". During the consideration of the Bill in the House, an amendment was moved by L.K. Advani to include three other languages, namely, Santali, Maithili and Dogri in the Eighth Schedule. The amendment was adopted by the House, and a newly substituted section 2 provided for inclusion of Bodo as Entry No. 3, Dogri as Entry No. 4, Maithili as Entry No. 10, Santali as Entry No. 18 and also for consequential re-numbering of the existing entries, accordingly. The Bill, as passed by the Lok Sabha, was considered and passed by the Rajya Sabha on 23 December 2003.

Speaking in the Lok Sabha on 22 December, Advani stated that the constitutional amendment to include Bodo was "in pursuance of a very valuable Memorandum of Settlement arrived at between the representatives of the Bodo community, the Government of Assam and the Government of India". A part of the settlement was that the Government of India would consider inclusion of Bodo language in the Eighth Schedule of the Constitution. Janeshwar Mishra, Samajwadi Party Rajya Sabha MP, stated that no Indian language could flourish as long as the recognition given to English remained. Reacting to the demand for substituting English with any other Indian language, Advani stated that it was necessary that both English and Hindi co-exist for the unity of the country, stating, "National unity is more important than language issue." He further stated that de-linking from English was not a good thing, as he felt that knowledge of English gave India an advantage over China in the Information Technology sector. Laxmi Mall Singhvi, BJP Rajya Sabha MP, stated that the legislation's intention was not to reduce the impact or acceptability of Hindi by including more languages in the Eighth Schedule.

Congress member Pranab Mukherjee, stated that while he had no objection to any language being included in the Eighth Schedule, the Government should have consulted the Standing Committee to bring "a comprehensive and well thought-out legislation". He further added that, "piecemeal legislations as this would only create rift in the country". CPI(M) member Chandrakala Pandey named more than a dozen languages that she believed should be included in the Eighth Schedule. SP member Rama Shankar Kaushik felt that the Government needed to differentiate between "Bhasaha aur Boli" (language and dialect), stating, "If you cease to differentiate between language and dialect, you will end up reducing the status of Hindi as the official language and that will create tension on the basis of language." RJD chief Lalu Prasad Yadav felt that inclusion of a language or dialect in the Eighth Schedule should be done carefully and comprehensively to ensure that there was no dispute on the language medium of examinations, finding teachers, and programmes on radio and television.

DMK member S. Viduthalai Virumbi stated that Hindi was not a "majority language", and demanded that the official language of a State be included as official language of the country. Verumbi was interrupted by SP member Amar Singh, who objected to opposition to Hindi, saying, "I respect Tamil but to oppose Hindi is not correct."

The bill received assent from then President A. P. J. Abdul Kalam on 7 January 2004, and came into force on the same date. It was notified in The Gazette of India on 8 January 2004.

== Reception ==
Adivasi youths celebrated the passage of the 92nd Amendment by bursting crackers and distributing sweets at various tribal-dominated areas such as Karandih, Parsudih, Kadma and Birsanagar.

BJP Lok Sabha MP from Mayurbhanj, Odisha, Salkhan Murmu termed the day that the bill passed as historic for tribal people. Murmu further expressed that the long-cherished dreams of the tribals had been fulfilled, saying, "This is the first time that the Adivasis have got recognition". Murmu had tabled the proposal for the inclusion of the Santali language in the Eighth Schedule in the Lok Sabha. Murmu stated that he would now fight for the inclusion of other tribal languages like Ho, Kuruk and Munda in the Eighth Schedule.

President of Jharkhand Disom Party (JDP) women cell Sumitra Murmu stated that the long battle which Salkhan initiated 20 years ago for the inclusion of the language in the Eighth Schedule had been won. Jharkhand Mukti Morcha chief Shibu Soren described inclusion of Santhali language as "not surprising", saying, "It was a political decision and had to happen some day."

== See also ==
- List of amendments of the Constitution of India
