= Danwar language =

Indo-Aryan language spoken in Nepal

Danuwar
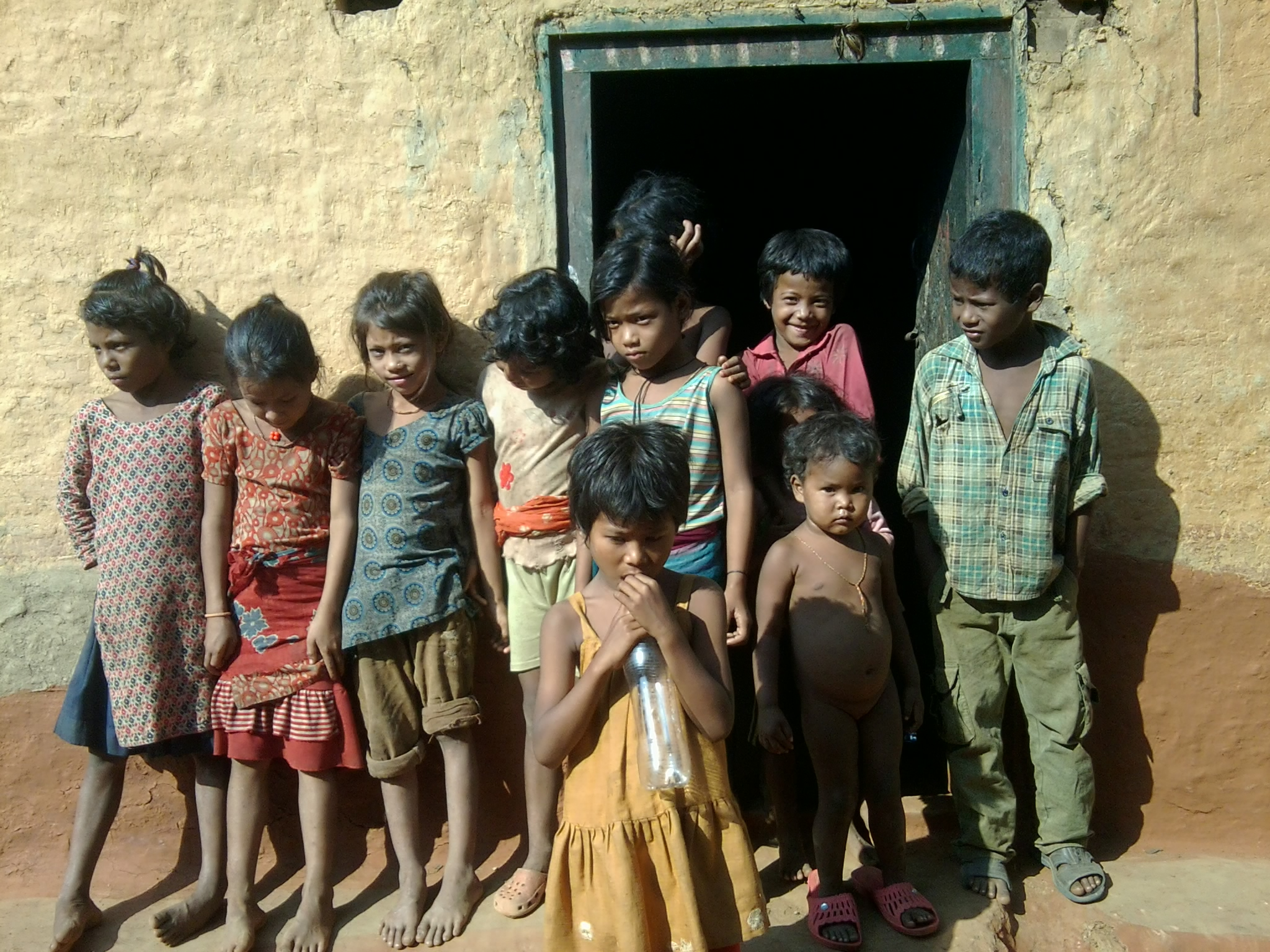
- Native to: Nepal
- Ethnicity: Danuwar
- Native speakers: 46,000 (2011 census)
- Language family: Indo-European: Indo-Iranian; Indo-Aryan; Eastern Zone (Magadhan); Bihari; (unclassified); Danuwar

Language codes
- ISO 639-3: dhw – Dhanwar
- Glottolog: dhan1265 -Done Danuwar koch1253 Kochariya-East Danuwar
- ELP: Dhanwar

Danuwar (also rendered Danwar, Denwar, Dhanvar, Dhanwar) is a language spoken in parts of Nepal by Danuwar ethnic group. It is close to Bote-Darai and Tharu languages but otherwise unclassified within the Indo-Aryan languages.
