= Bahun Bhanjyang =

Bahun Bhanjyang is located in Gandakī Pradesh, Western Region, Nepal. It is in the superior administrative division of Tanahun District located in Bandipur Rural Municipality.
