= Leipzig Convent =

Coordinates: 52.1869°N 108.6808°W

- Interactive map of the Leipzig Convent area

General information
- Architectural style: Collegiate Gothic
- Location: Leipzig, Reford No. 379, Saskatchewan, Canada
- Completed: Dec. 28, 1927
- Cost: $87,000
- Client: School Sisters of Notre Dame

Technical details
- Structural system: masonry
- Size: 20,000 sq. foot

The Leipzig Convent (also called the Notre Dame Convent and Boarding School or Notre Dame Convent) is a provincially designated historic building located in the former village of Leipzig now part of the Rural Municipality of Reford No. 379, Saskatchewan, Canada. The property contains a four-story building in a Collegiate Gothic style, made of red brick. The school convent is near the Leipzig Church that was built in 1915.

== History ==
Four religious sisters from the School Sisters of Notre Dame arrived in Leipzig in Aug. 26, 1926 from Canadian Motherhouse in Hamilton, Ontario and began their work using a small home that would serve as temporary quarters until a larger convent school building could be built the following year.

The building was constructed as a convent and school for 20 girls and boys from the Leipzig area, eventually becoming a residence only for high-school girls and a day elementary school for local boys and girls. Over its 42-years of operation the facility functioned predominantly as a high school, formally recognized by the Department of Education through which the teachers were inspected and salaried, and the students were issued Departmental exams. With school district amalgamations, the school closed in 1969. The building was subsequently auctioned off and over the next four years, for a time, served as a dentist office, bakery, and was even purchased by an American group intending to turn it into a hunting lodge.

== Sale ==
After being a family residence and bed and breakfast, in 2004 the property was placed on the market for $100,000 and included such features as a stone grotto, bakery, tree-lined carriage path, surrounded by spruce, maple and elm trees.

In 2008, the 40-room building was purchased by Gary Corkum, Dan and Ardyth Clark, who over the next two years converted into the Leipzig Serenity Retreat for people recovering from addictions.
