= School Sisters of Notre Dame =

Female Roman Catholic religious congregation

Coordinates: 41°53′6.08″N 12°24′0.68″E

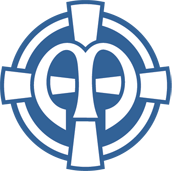
- Abbreviation: SSND
- Established: 1833; 193 years ago
- Founder: Karolina Gerhardinger
- Purpose: Christian education
- Location(s): 95 Via della Stazione Aurelia Rome, Italy
- Region served: World-wide, 34 countries
- Members: 3,000+
- Foundress: Theresa Gerhardinger
- Main organ: Visions
- Affiliations: Roman Catholic
- Website: gerhardinger.org

School Sisters of Notre Dame is a worldwide religious institute of Catholic sisters founded in Bavaria in 1833 and devoted to primary, secondary, and post-secondary education. Their life in mission centers on prayer, community life and ministry. They serve as teachers, lawyers, accountants, nurses, administrators, therapists, social workers, pastoral ministers, social justice advocates and more.

The School Sisters of Notre Dame are known by the abbreviation "SSND" and are not to be confused with another teaching order, the Sisters of Notre Dame de Namur (SNDdeN), which was founded in France.

== Founding and growth ==
The School Sisters of Notre Dame developed from the Canonesses of Saint-Augustin of the Notre-Dame Congregation, founded by Peter Fourier and Alix Le Clerc in the Duchy of Lorraine in 1597 for the free education of poor girls. In the seventeenth and eighteenth centuries, several convents of the congregation were established in Germany.

Karolina Gerhardinger commenced her training as a lay teacher at the local monastery of the Canonesses Regular of Notre Dame in Ratisbon. She developed her skills as a teacher at the monastery until it—like all monastic communities—was closed in 1809 after the Napoleonic army had occupied Bavaria. By 1812 she had secured a teaching accreditation and began teaching at a girls school in Regensburg. In 1815 she asked Bishop of Regensburg, Georg Michael Wittmann, for guidance on entering the religious life, although she was unable to pursue this religious calling at that time. However, she continued to teach at the school from 1816 until 1833.

The congregation was founded in Bavaria in 1833, during a time of poverty and illiteracy under Bishop Wittmann of Ratisbon and Father Job of Vienna. While retaining the essential features of the rule and constitutions given by Peter Fourier, they widened the scope of the Sisters' educational work. Its founder Karolina Gerhardinger, known by the religious name of Mary Theresa of Jesus, formed a community with two other women in Neunburg vorm Wald to teach the poor.

In 1839 they removed to a suburb of Munich, and in 1843, into a former Poor Clare convent, built in 1284 and situated within the city limits. In 1847, Blessed Theresa and five companion sisters traveled to the United States to aid German immigrants, especially girls and women. That year the sisters staffed schools in three German parishes in Baltimore, Maryland: St. James, St. Michael, and St. Alphonsus, as well as opened the Institute of Notre Dame, a private school for German girls. Eventually, the congregation spread across the United States and into Canada, ultimately forming eight North American Provinces.

== Governance ==
The original rule of the School Sisters of Notre Dame, approved by Pope Pius IX in 1865, allowed Blessed Theresa and her successors, instead of local bishops, to govern the congregation. The main motherhouse was moved from Neunburg vorm Wald to Munich in 1843 and remained there until the 1950s. Today, the Generalate of the Congregation can be found in Rome, Italy.

=== Provinces ===
The global congregation is currently divided into provinces, each with their own provincial council and province-level governance.

- Province of Africa
- Atlantic-Midwest Province
- Bavarian Province (absorbed two other provinces as sub-districts in February 2022)
  - District of Austria-Italy
  - District of Czechoslovakia
- Central Pacific Province
- Hungarian Province
- Province of Latin America and the Caribbean
- Polish Province
- Slovenian Province

== Works ==
Much of their work has been in schools, but the curriculum vitae of a group of jubilarians in 2014, from a province based in St. Louis, showed a wide variety of assignments: spiritual direction, retreats, adult basic education, RCIA programs, pastoral care among Hispanics, in hospitals, and among the disadvantaged, language interpreting, outreach to native Americans and to migrants (also founding an Immigrant and Refugee Women's Program), and on mission to Honduras, Hungary, Sierra Leone, Ghana, and Japan. Empowering underserved women has been a special effort of theirs. Their involvement in migrant services is evidenced in their hosting at the US-Mexican border a conference for Shalom, an international network for justice, peace, and integrity of creation.

In 2017 more than 3,000 School Sisters of Notre Dame were working in thirty-four countries in Europe, North America, Latin America, Asia, Africa and Oceania. Africa has come to produce the largest number of vocations.

== Nun Study of Aging and Alzheimer's Disease ==
Since 1986, 678 members of the congregation in the United States have been participating in Nun Study of Aging and Alzheimer's Disease, a longitudinal study of aging and Alzheimer's disease. Convent archives have been made available to investigators as a resource on the history of participants. The sisters participated in yearly intellectual and physical tests, including memory tests, basic living assessments (putting on a sweater, pouring a glass of water), mobility, and more. These sisters also agreed to donate their brains to science upon their death. These sisters have played an integral role the progressive research of Alzheimer's Disease because of their uniquely similar backgrounds and living habits.

== Education ==
=== Schools ===
==== Asia ====
- Notre Dame School, Bandipur, Nepal

==== Europe ====
- Erzbischöfliche Liebfrauenschule, Bonn, Germany
- Lingfield College, Surrey, UK
- Theresia-Gerhardinger-Gymnasium am Anger (de), Munich, Germany
- Patrona Hungariae Katolikus Iskolaközpont, Budapest, Hungary
- Svetits Katolikus Óvoda, Általános Iskola, Gimnázium és Kollégium, Debrecen, Hungary
- Karolina Óvoda, Általános Iskola, Gimnázium, Alapfokú Művészeti Iskola és Kollégium, Szeged, Hungary
- Szent István Egyházi Általános Iskola és Kollégium, Makó, Hungary

==== North America ====
Canada

- Notre Dame Convent and School, Leipzig, Saskatchewan (closed)
- Mother House, Waterdown, Ontario, Notre Dame Academy and Convent (closed)

United States (including territories)

- Academy of the Holy Angels, Demarest, New Jersey
- Academia del Perpetuo Socorro, Puerto Rico
- Academia San Jorge, Puerto Rico
- Colegio Católico Notre Dame, Puerto Rico
- Institute of Notre Dame, Baltimore, Maryland (closed)
- Notre Dame Catholic School, Spring Hill, Florida
- Notre Dame High School, St. Louis, Missouri
- Notre Dame High School, Talofofo, Guam
- Notre Dame Preparatory School, Towson, Maryland
- Rosati-Kain High School, St. Louis, Missouri (cofounders)
- Saint Saviour High School, Brooklyn, New York
- School Sisters of Notre Dame Educational Center, Woodhaven, Queens, New York

=== Tertiary institutions ===
- Kyoto Notre Dame University, Kyoto, Japan (closing in 2028)
- Notre Dame of Maryland University, Baltimore, Maryland, USA
- Mount Mary University, Milwaukee, Wisconsin, USA

== Notable members ==
- Catherine Cesnik, American high school teacher whose 1969 murder was the subject of the documentary series The Keepers
- Maria Antonina Kratochwil, Polish martyr during World War II
- Maria Stanisia, American painter
- Margaret Traxler, American women's rights activist
- Mary Theresa of Jesus Gerhardinger, founder
