= Baspani =

Baspani or Banspani may refer to a number of populated places:

== India ==
- Baspani, Betul District, in Betul District, Madhya Pradesh

== Nepal ==
- Baspani, Dhankuta District
- Baspani, Mahalaxmi, Dhankuta District
- Baspani, Dolakha District
- Baspani, Dhangadi, Kailali District
- Baspani, Mohanyal, Kailali District
- Baspani, Khotang District
- Baspani, Makwanpur District
- Baspani, Nukawot District
- Baspani, Pyuthan District
- Baspani, Sindhupalchowk District
- Baspani, Gutu, Surkhet District
- Baspani, Lagam, Surkhet District
- Baspani, Syangja District
- Baspani, Anbu Khaireni, Tanahun District
- Baspani, Bandipur, Tanahun District
- Baspani, Devghat, Tanahun District
- Baspani, Terhathum District
- Baspani, Udayapur District
