= Karolina Gerhardinger =

Bavarian sister/educator

Blessed Karolina Gerhardinger S.S.N.D.
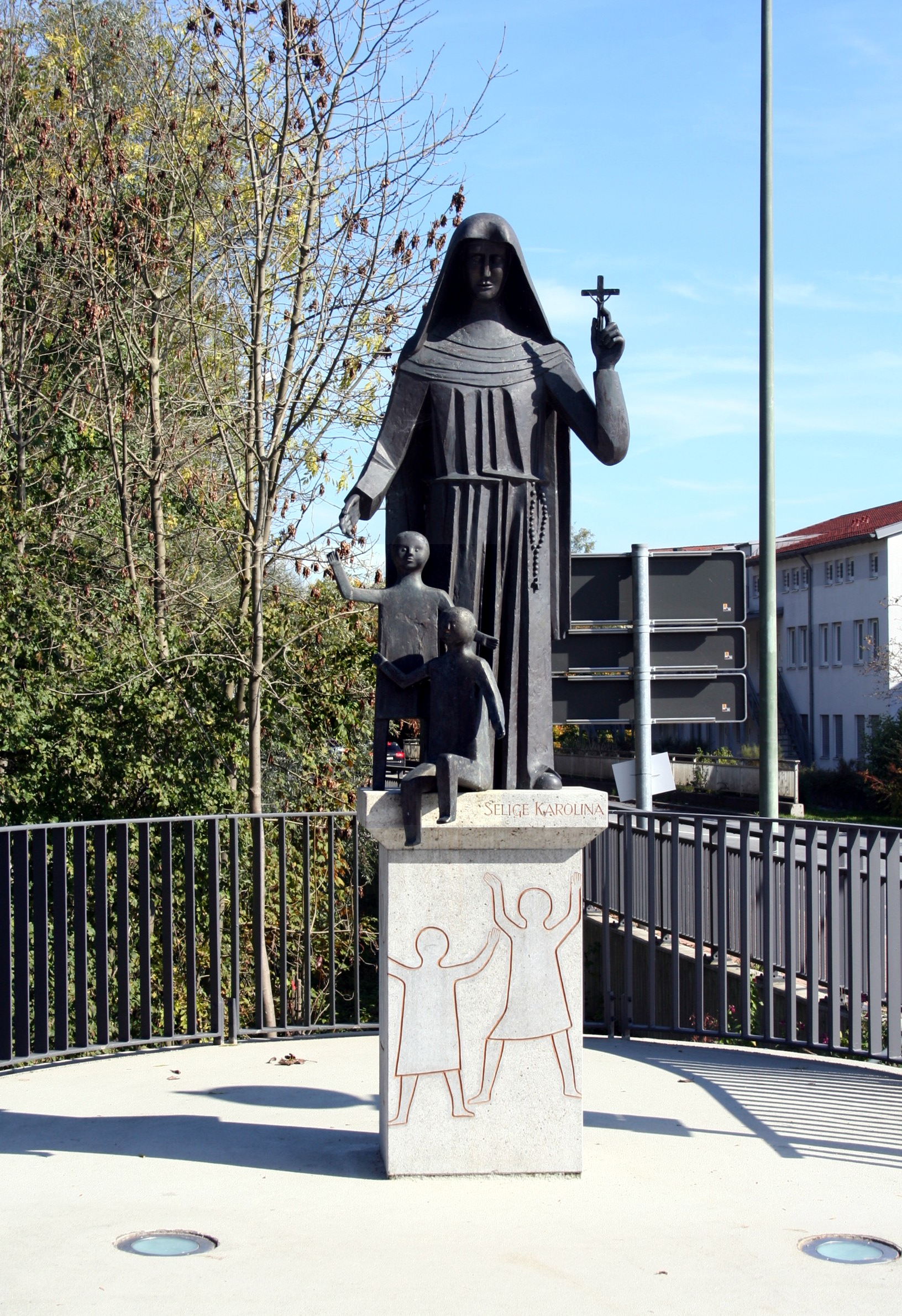
- Karolina Gerhardinger statue at the Corbinian bridge in Freising

Religious
- Born: 20 June 1797; Stadtamhof, Bavaria, Holy Roman Empire
- Died: 9 May 1879 (aged 81); Munich, Bavaria, German Empire
- Resting place: St. James's Church, Munich, Germany
- Venerated in: Roman Catholic Church (School Sisters of Notre Dame)
- Beatified: 17 November 1985, Saint Peter's Square, Vatican City, by Pope John Paul II
- Canonized: 17 May 1986
- Feast: 9 May
- Attributes: Religious habit of the School Sisters
- Patronage: Educators

Karolina Gerhardinger (20 June 1797 – 9 May 1879) (also known as Mother Maria Theresia of Jesus) was a German Roman Catholic religious sister who founded the School Sisters of Notre Dame. Gerhardinger served as an educator in Bavaria until the establishment of her order, which provided free education to the poor and soon expanded in Europe.

The canonization process for Gerhardinger was opened in 1952 under Pope Pius XII, when she was declared a Servant of God. Pope John Paul II declared her Venerable in 1983 and beatified her on 17 November 1985.

== Life ==
Gerhardinger was born in Bavaria on 20 June 1797 as the sole child of Willibard and Franziska Gerhardinger.

As a young woman, her parish priest encouraged Gerhardinger to become a teacher, as did the Bishop of Regensburg, Georg Michael Wittmann. She commenced her training as a lay teacher at the local monastery of the Canonesses Regular of Notre Dame, founded by Peter Fourier in 17th century France for the free education of poor girls. She developed her skills as a teacher at the monastery until it—-like all monastic communities—-was closed in 1809, after Bavaria had been occupied by the Napoleonic army. By 1812 she had secured a teaching accreditation and began teaching at a girls school in Regensburg. In 1815 she asked Wittmann for guidance on entering the religious life. Unable to pursue this religious calling, however, she taught at that school from 1816 until 1833.

In 1828 the Bavarian government reached an accord with the Holy See, which allowed religious communities to re-establish themselves. Gerhardinger eventually decided to begin an order of her own, devoted to Christian education of poor children. She took as her model the Constitutions of the Augustinian canonesses, but adapted to a more flexible way of life than that required by their enclosed life.

Gerhardinger moved in with two companions to start living the religious life on 24 October 1833 – this saw the formal establishment of the Poor Teachers Sisters of Notre Dame, commonly called the School Sisters of Notre Dame. There were initial complications for official recognition, but King Ludwig I granted them approval for a monastic cloister in March 1834. She made her religious vows in the Saint Gallus chapel in Regensburg on 16 November 1835 and assumed the name of "Maria Theresia of Jesus". She accompanied five religious in 1847 to the United States to assist the many German immigrants who were starting new lives there in great numbers, often without a command of English. The order received initial approval on 21 January 1854 and full approval from Pope Pius IX in 1865. From 1850 the order spread to England and other European nations.

Gerhardinger fell ill in 1877, which prompted Pope Pius to send her a telegram with his blessings. She died in 1879 in the presence of her religious sisters and the papal nuncio, Cardinal Gaetano Aloisi Masella. Her remains are housed in Saint James's Church in Munich.

== Beatification ==
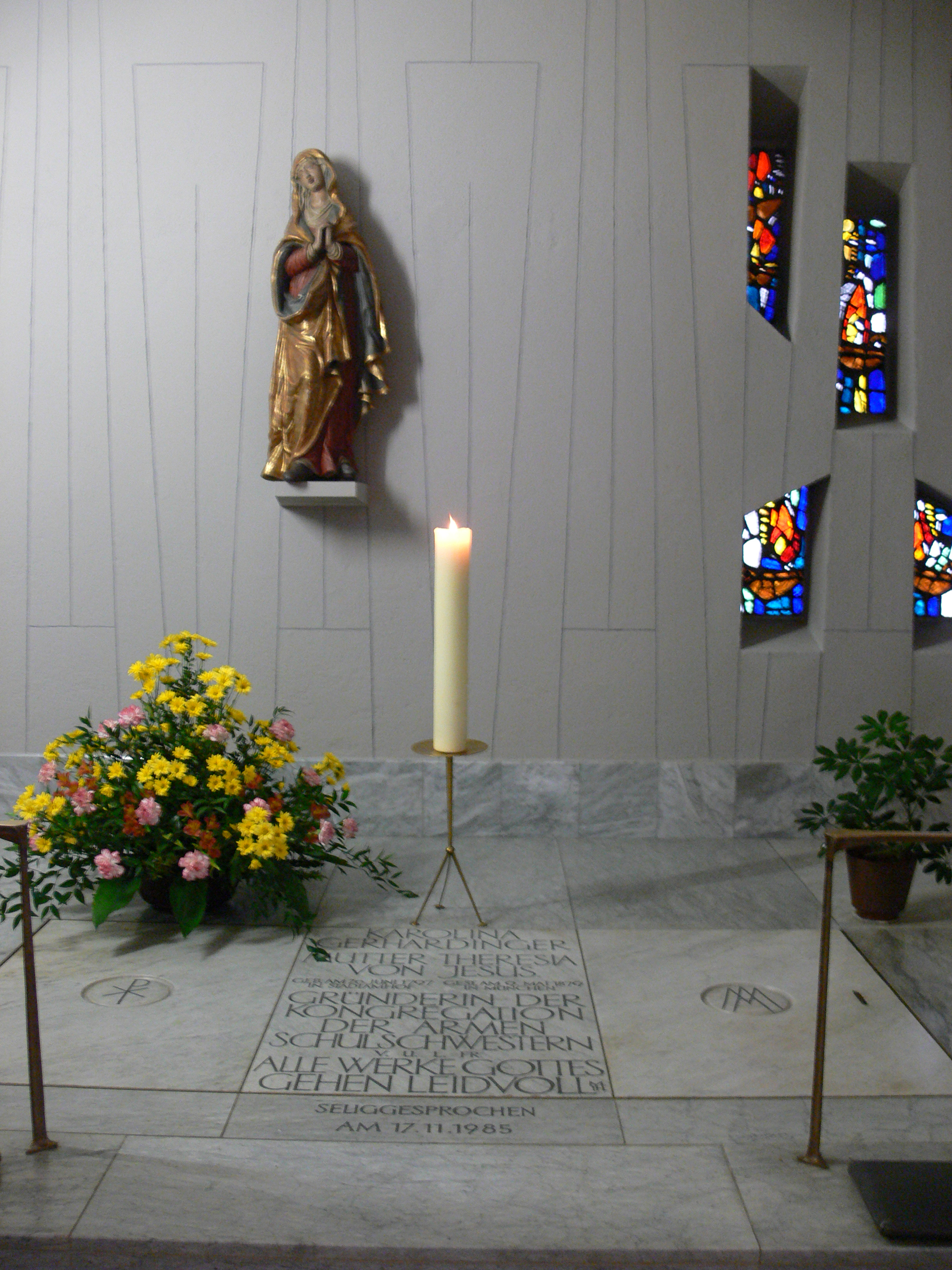
Tomb

The informative process for the beatification cause commenced in 1929 that Cardinal Michael von Faulhaber both inaugurated and later closed in 1932. Theologians approved her writings on 22 February 1933 while the apostolic process opened in 1953 and concluded in 1955. The Congregation of Rites validated the previous two processes in Rome on 31 January 1952. The formal introduction of the cause came under Pope Pius XII on 11 July 1952, granting her the title of Servant of God.

The Congregation for the Causes of Saints had their officials and consultants discuss the cause in a meeting on 18 May 1982, in which the board approved the cause, while the bishop and cardinal members of the C.C.S. approved the cause on 7 December 1982. Pope John Paul II declared Gerhardinger to be Venerable on 13 January 1983 after confirming her heroic virtue.

The process for investigating a miracle attributed to her opened and concluded in the area that it originated in and received C.C.S. validation on 3 July 1983. The medical board approved the miracle on 8 November 1984, while consulting theologians also voiced approval to the miracle on 28 February 1985. The C.C.S. approved the miracle on 16 April 1985 while John Paul II granted final assent to the healing on 9 May 1985.

John Paul II beatified her on 17 November 1985.
