= Notre Dame School (Bandipur, Nepal) =

Notre Dame Secondary School
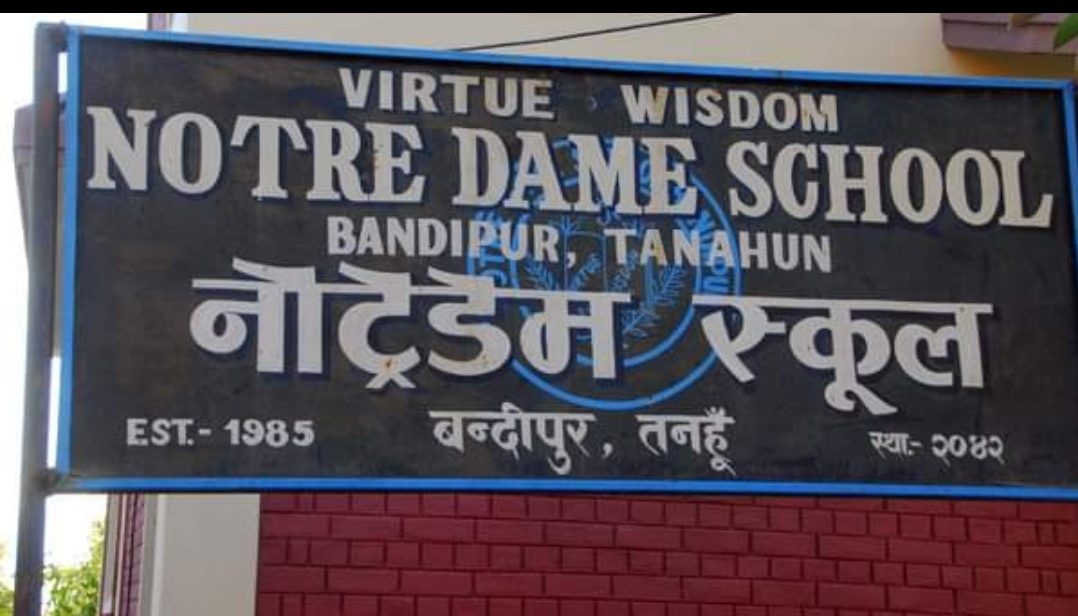

Location
- Bandipur-04, Balabazar; Bandipur, Gandaki; Nepal

Information
- Type: Not for Profit Primary and Secondary school
- Motto: Virtue Wisdom
- Established: 1985 A.D.
- School district: Tanahun
- Principal: Sister Merium
- Staff: 40+
- Grades: Nursery -12
- Gender: Co-Educational
- Enrollment: 800+
- Nickname: Notre Damer
- Affiliation: Bandipur Rural Municipality, NEB

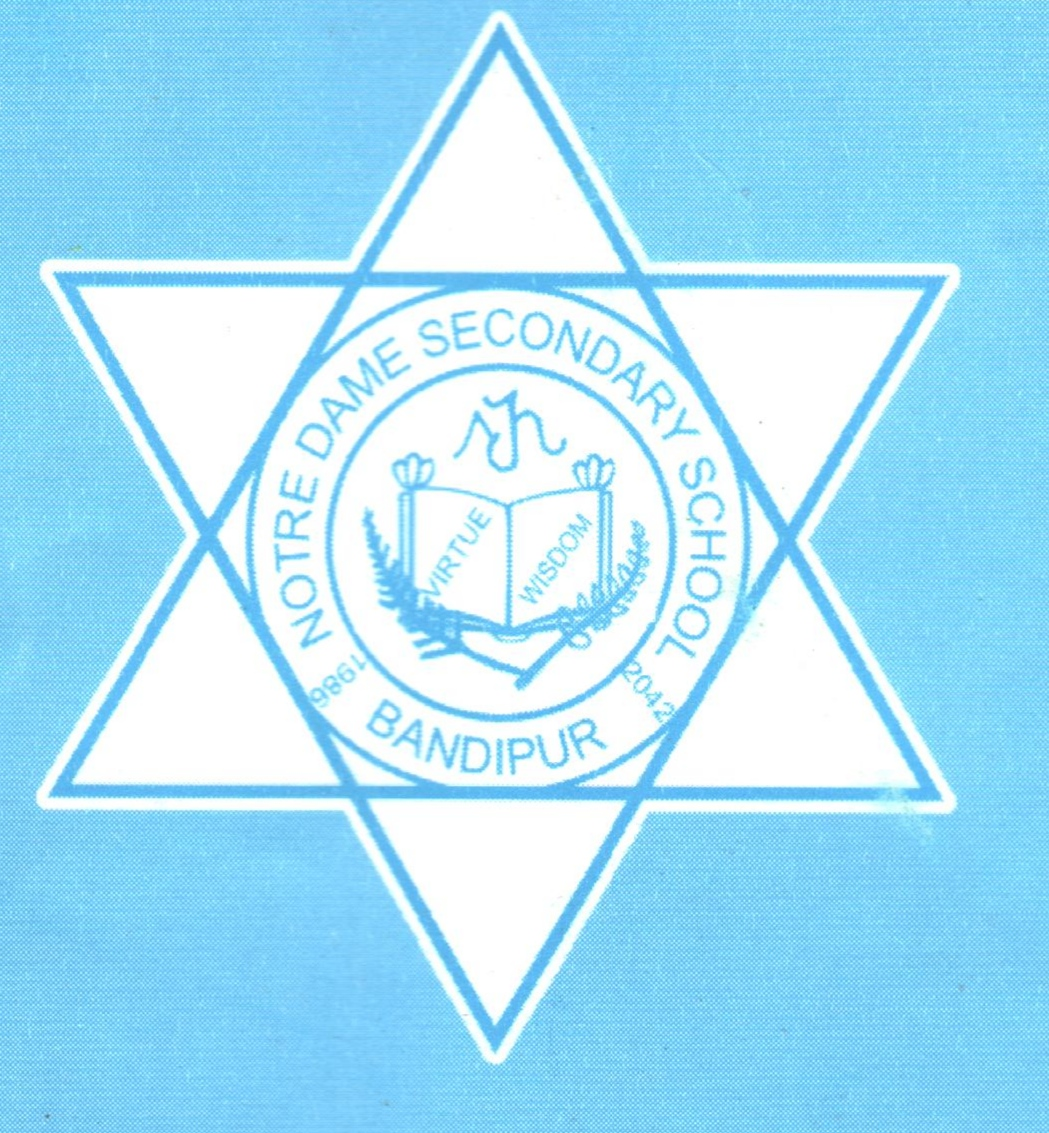
School Seal

Notre Dame School (NDS) is a school Catholic school located in Bandipur, Nepal The school was founded by the School Sisters of Notre Dame (SSND), a congregation of Roman Catholic sisters founded in Bavaria in 1833 and devoted to educating students at all levels around the world.

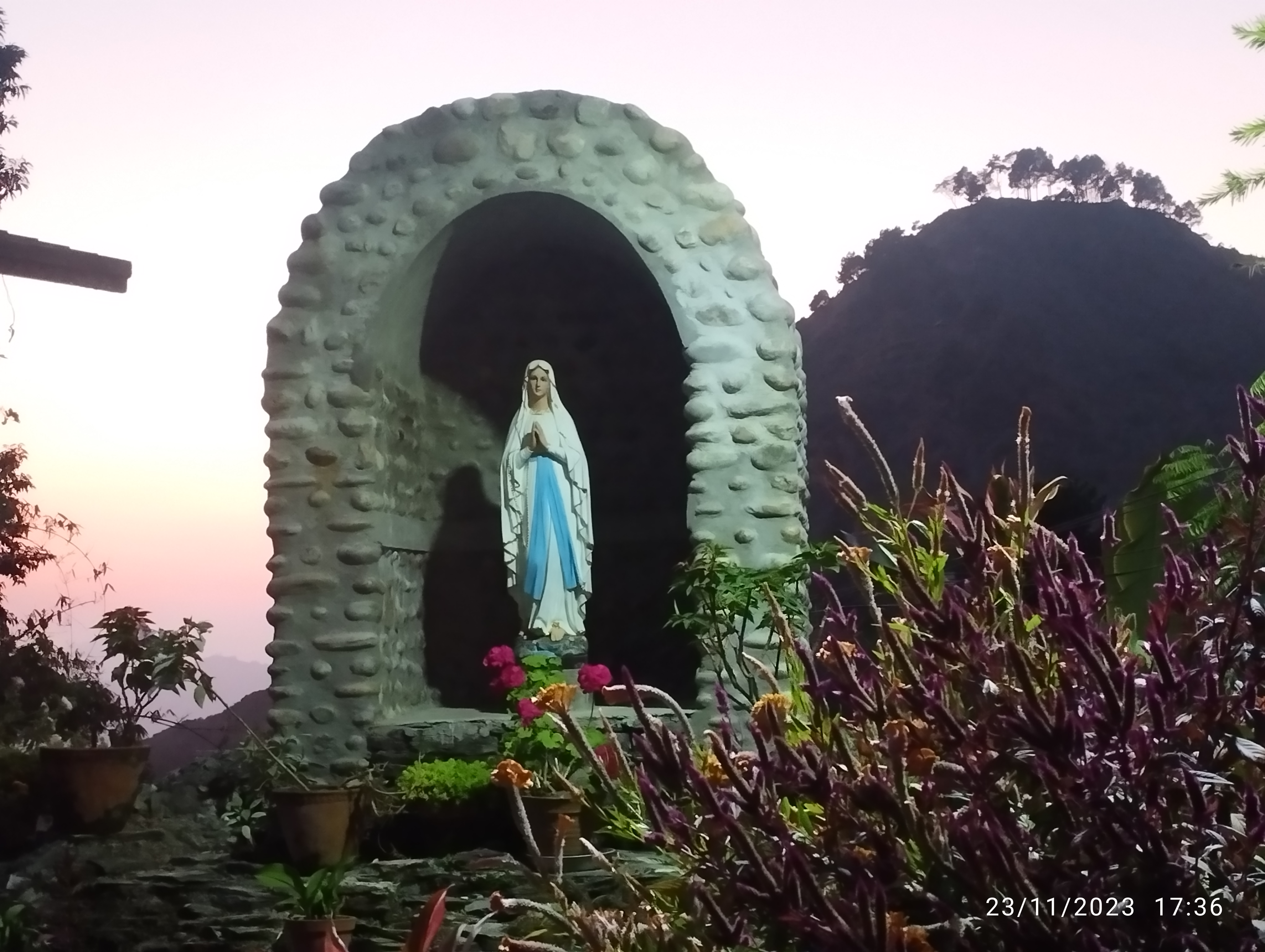
The statue of Our Lady (Notre Dame)

NDS was opened in Bandipur in 1985 as a kindergarten school by School Sisters of Notre Dame (SSND ) sisters from Japan and it was soon expanded into a primary school. The first batch of students completed the 10th grade, which marks the end of high school and beginning of college education in Nepal, in 1996. In 1997, NDS started offering the 10-plus-2 program in Science under the Higher Secondary Education Board of Nepal.

== Administration ==
The institution is controlled administratively by Christian Catholic Missionary and its a convent school. The founder principal was Sister Evenjala.

=== Past principals ===
- Sister Evenjala
- Sister Janet Tanaka
- Sister Merium
- Fr. Silas Bogati
- Fr. Denis D'Suza

== Alumni Association ==
Ex-Students (Old NDs) of the institution had their first ever meet on 7 th Magh 2079 B.S . ( 21 January 2023 ) and formed themselves Alumni Association for further activities .

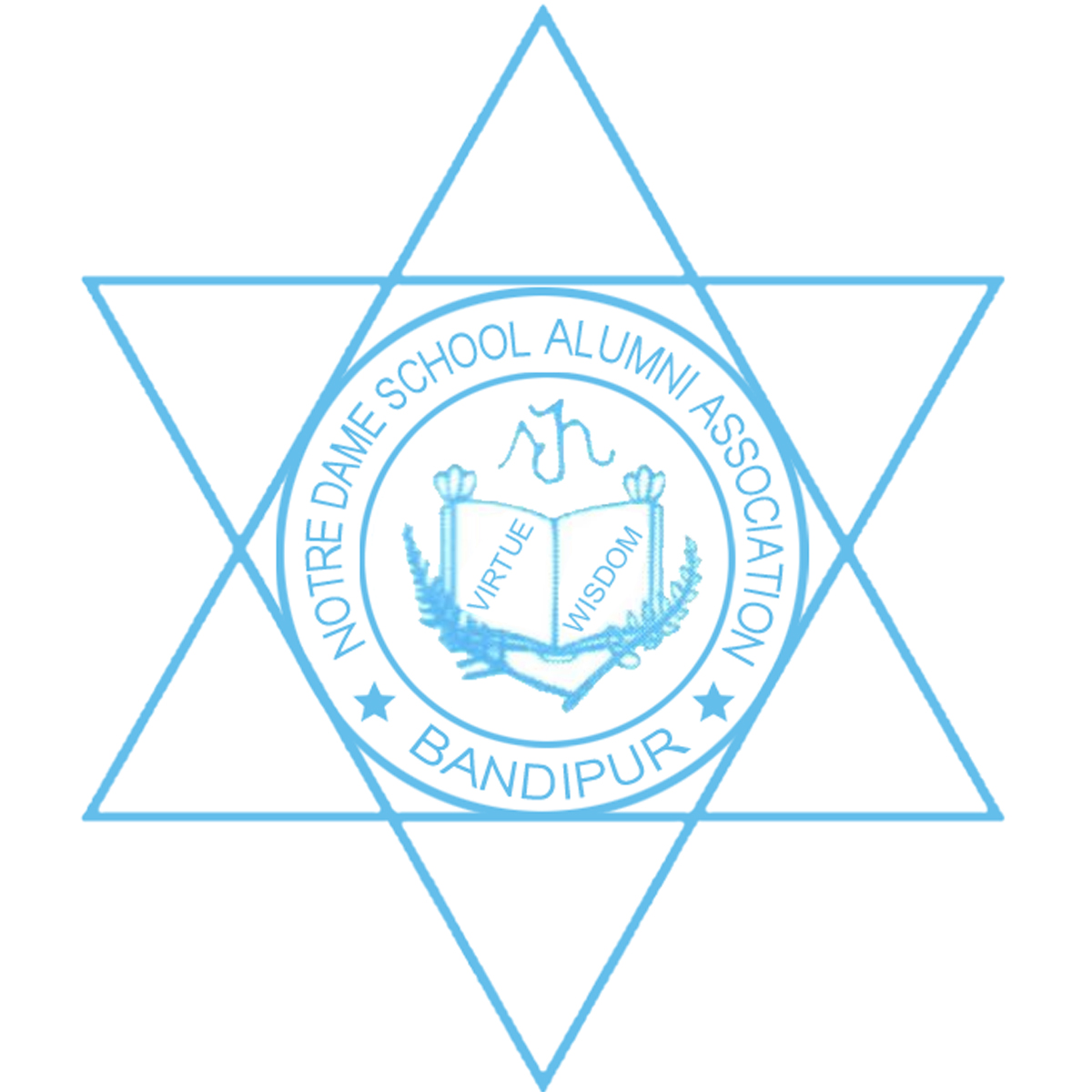
Notre Dame Alumni Seal

=== Ad hoc Committee ===
- Madan Krishna Adhikari ( Co-ordinator )
- Tara Bhattarai ( Member )
- Sachin Raj Piya ( Member )
- Rasmina Pradhan ( Member )
- Sulove Piya (Member)
- Bishow Prakash Sulpe (Member)
- Rabindu Shrestha (Member )

=== Membership ===
- Eligibility for Association membership extends to students who have completed at least two academic years at Notre Dame School, with the exception of those who solely undertook tenth or twelfth-grade studies, and appeared solely for the final examination.
