= Dharampani, Tanahun =

Dharampani धरमपानी
- Location in Nepal Dharampani (Nepal)
- Coordinates: 27.88°N 84.38°E
- Country: Nepal
- Zone: Gandaki Zone
- District: Tanahu District

Population (1991)
  - Total: 3,444
- Time zone: UTC+5:45 (Nepal Time)

Dharampani is a market center in Bandipur Municipality in Tanahu District in the Gandaki Zone of central Nepal. The formerly Village Development Committee was merged to form new municipality since 18 May 2014. At the time of the 1991 Nepal census it had a population of 3444 people living in 616 individual households.
