= Khadga Jatra =

Festival in Nepal

Khadga Jatra (Nepali: खड्ग जात्रा) is a festival celebrated in Bandipur, Nepal. It occurs in the time of Dashain festival. In the Khadga Jatra, a religious service is carried out at the Khadga Devi temple. Magra and Bihwokarma communities parade through the town with a sacred sword which is worshipped by the Hindu devotees. The sword is believed to have belonged to king Mukunda Sen.
