= Bandipur Rural Municipality =

Bandipur बन्दिपुर
- Rural municipality Hill station
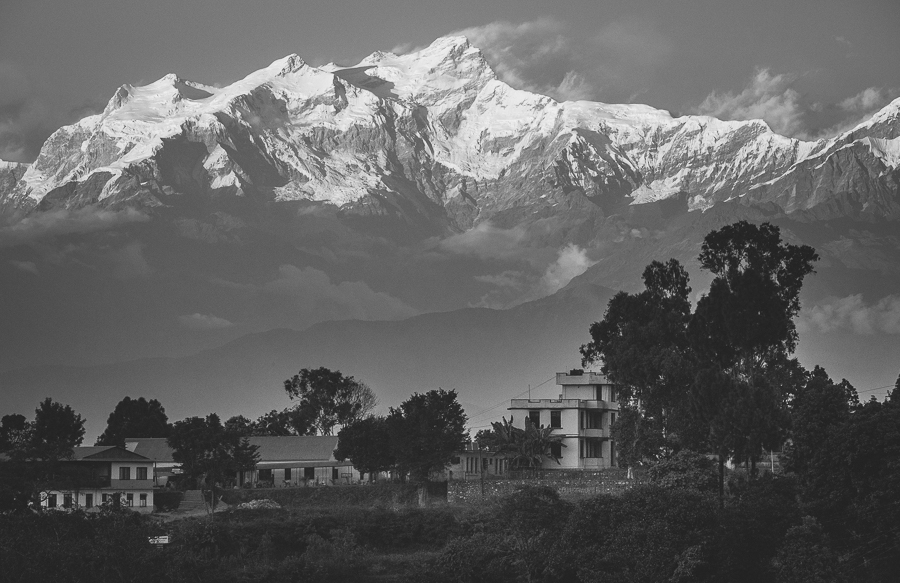
- The Ganesh Himal mountain range as seen from Bandipur, Central Nepal. November 19, 2017
- Nickname: Queen of the hills
- Location in Nepal Bandipur (Nepal)
- Coordinates: 27°56′N 84°25′E
- Country: Nepal
- Province: Gandaki Province
- District: Tanahun District

Government
  - Type: Rural municipality
  - Chairperson: Surendra Bahadur Thapa
  - Vice-chairperson: Pancha Maya Gurung
- Elevation: 1,030 m (3,380 ft)

Population (2011)
  - Total: 15,591
- Time zone: UTC+5:45 (NST)
- Postal code: 33904
- Area code: 056
- Website: Bandipur Rural municipality

Bandipur (Nepali: बन्दिपुर) is a hilltop settlement and a rural municipality in Tanahun District, Gandaki province of Nepal. Bandipur is primarily known for its preserved, old cultural atmosphere. At the time of the 2011 Nepal census, Bandipur and Dharampani had a combined population of 15,591 people living in 3,750 individual households.

== Location ==
Bandipur is located at 27.56 N, 84.25 E and an elevation of 1030m on a mountain saddle (Mahabharat range) approximately 700m above the Marsyangdi River Valley, 143 km to the west of Kathmandu and 80 km to the east of Pokhara. Since 1998 it is connected by an 8 km access road from Dumre (Prithvi Highway). Until then there was only an unreliable road, in monsoon usually not accessible or only by tractors. The mountain saddle, just 200m long, is barely wide enough to accommodate the main street lined by 2 –3 storey buildings on either side. At the backsides of these houses the mountainsides steeply descend and the gardens are only accessible by stairs.

== History ==
Bandipur was established as a funnelling point of trade by Newar traders from Bhaktapur in the Kathmandu valley after it had been conquered in 1768 by Prithvi Narayan Shah. They took advantage of its malaria free location to develop it into an important stop along the India-Tibet trade route. With them they brought their cultural heritage and architecture which basically has remained unchanged to this day.

Originally a simple Magar village in the early 19th. Century Bandipur developed into prosperous trading centre and a community with town-like features: substantial buildings, with their neoclassical façades and shuttered windows and streets paved with slabs of silverish slate. Bandipur had its heyday in the Rana times (1846–1951), when, as a measure of its power and prestige, it was granted special permission to have its own library (still existing).

In the 1970s, trading fell into a steep decline with the construction of the Prithvi Highway. For technical reasons it was logically built in the Marsyangdi valley, leaving Bandipur isolated up on the mountain. In addition to that, as a result of its poor accessibility, Bandipur lost importance because the district headquarters of Tanahun were moved to Damauli. The tradesmen of Bandipur were forced to move down to Dumre and many even left for the Terai; Bandipur turned a semi-ghost town. The population declined considerably.

On two occasions Bandipur has witnessed some turmoil. The people were not easily and readily sidestepped by the construction of the road and fought for a different route in the planning process. In the 1970s, when the first demonstrations for democracy took place in Nepal, the people of Bandipur stormed the little garrison. Several people were killed and the soldiers fled. Again, when the district headquarters were to be moved, the people demonstrated and occupied the administration. The civil servants fled during the night. Even the king was flown in by helicopter to calm the situation. However, the decline of the little town could not be reversed. Some relics of its wealthy past remain. Although many houses are in bad condition, the typical Newari architecture is preserved. A distinctive aspect of Bandipur's main street is a covered veranda extending along almost the entire length on the northern side. Most of the buildings still have little shops in them. The slate slabs in the main street have been destroyed by heavy vehicles, for which they were not made, but they can still be made out along the edges and in the smaller alleys. The library still exists and was carefully renovated in 2000. Another relic is a soccer-field-sized Tundikhel to the northeast of Bandipur and the villages importance as centre for schools for the surrounding villages.

== Administrative division ==
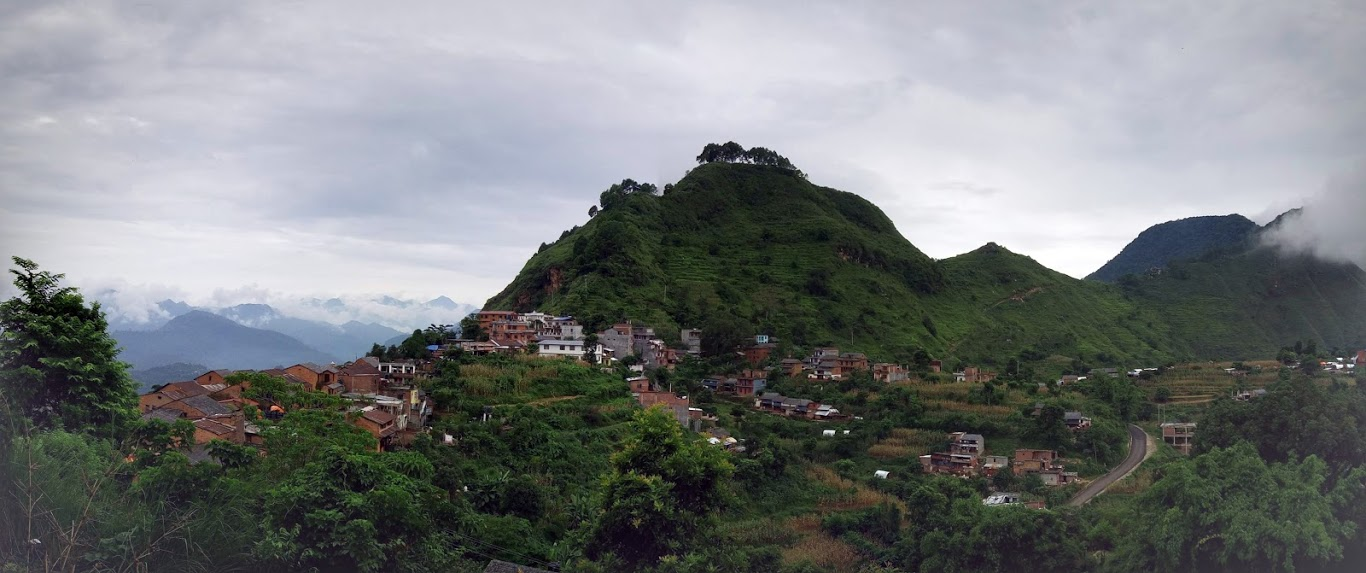
Bandipur Heights

=== Ward Profile ===
There are 6 wards in Bandipur Rural Municipality.

Bandipur Rural Municipality Ward Profile
Present Ward Number	Former VDC	Former Ward Number
1	Bandipur & Ghasikuwa	Bandipur 1, Ghasikuwa 1
2	Bandipur	Bandipur 1,2 & 3
3	Ghasikuwa & Keshavtar	Ghasikuwa 9, Keshavtar 1,8 & 9
4	Bandipur	Bandipur 4,5 & 6
5	Bandipur	Bandipur 7,8 & 9
6	Dharampani	Dharampani All (1–9)

=== Localities ===
- Baspani
- Dharampani

=== Municipality ===
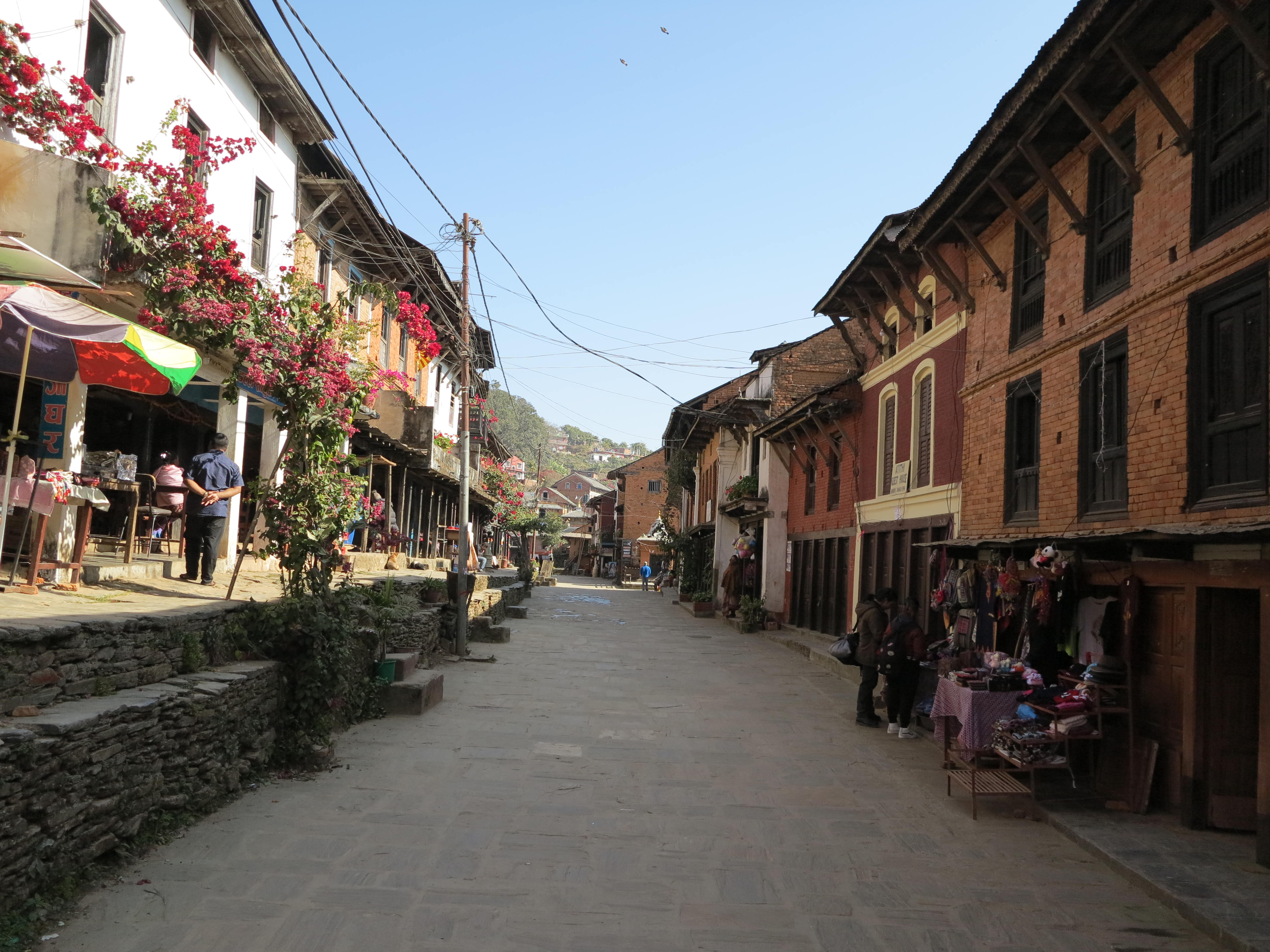
Street of Bandipur

A cabinet meeting held at the Prime Minister's Office, Singha Durbar on May 8, 2014, Thursday announced additional 72 municipalities, including previously proposed 37 municipalities in line with the Local Self-governance Act 1999. With this announcement Bandipur has been upgraded as one of the municipalities of Nepal, previously it was proposed municipality. Adjoining Dharampani VDC was merged with Bandipur to upgrade it to the municipality. From June 2, 2014, Monday onward with the inauguration program Bandipur village committee, formally started functioning as Bandipur Municipality.

== Education ==
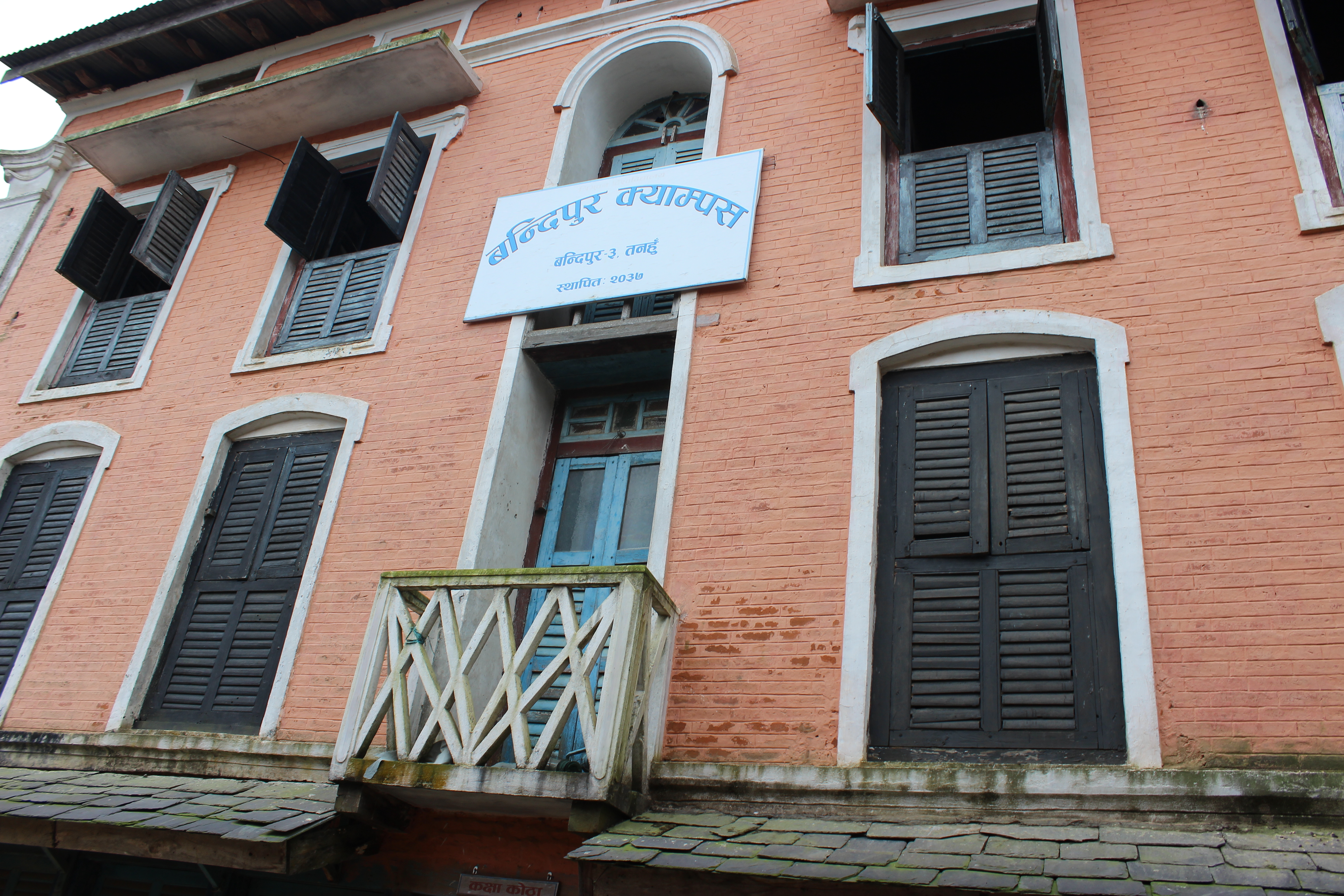
Bandipur Campus Building

=== Secondary schools ===
There are nine secondary schools in Bandipur .

- Bishnu Secondary School, Nahala
- Pabitra Secondary School, Peeple
- Manashlu Secondary School, Gurungtar
- Deepshikha Secondary School Dumre
- Arun Secondary School, Dharampani
- Shiva Secondary School, Seratar
- Kalika Secondary School, Kukurdi
- Notre Dame Higher Secondary School
- Bhanu Secondary School, Bandipur

Bhanu Secondary School established in the 1950s, only institution offering higher education till the 1980s and Notre Dame Higher Secondary School which was established in 1985, by the "School Sisters of Notre Dame" a Catholic missionary organization. It is one of the best schools in Nepal with a track record of 100% First Division pass out in the Higher Secondary Board Examination since its students appeared for Board Examination(SLC). The legacy is till today.

Bandipur has only one public graduate college "Bandipur Campus" affiliate to Tribhuvan University and offering Bachelor in Education program. Bandipur has few lower secondary schools beside above mentioned namely Dil Primary School, Ratna Rajya Middle School, Believers Academy.

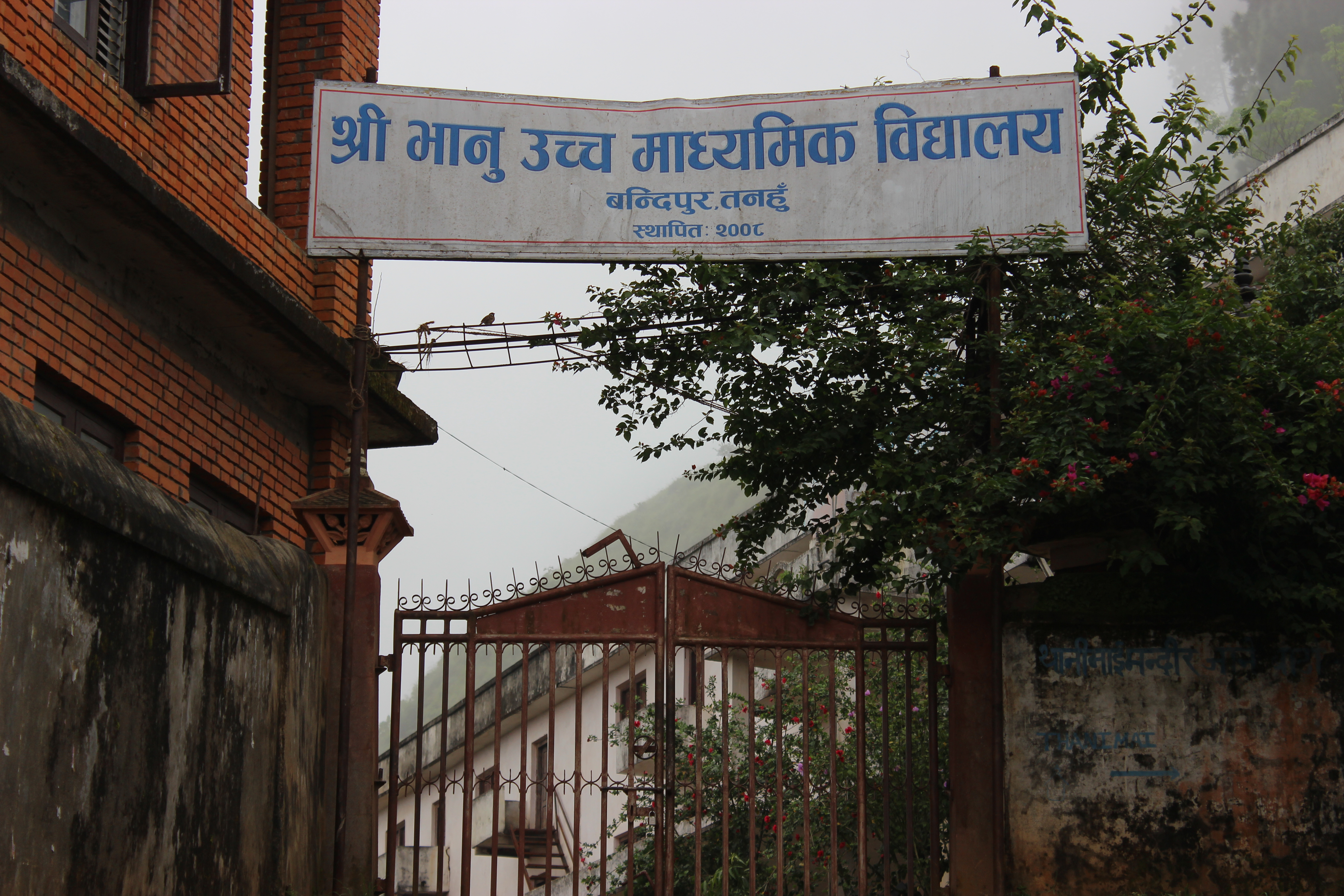
Bhanu School

=== Primary schools ===
Dil Primary School is the oldest educational institute in Bandipur established in 1976 B.S. (बि.स.१९७६) i.e. 1919 AD. It is situated near by municipality office .

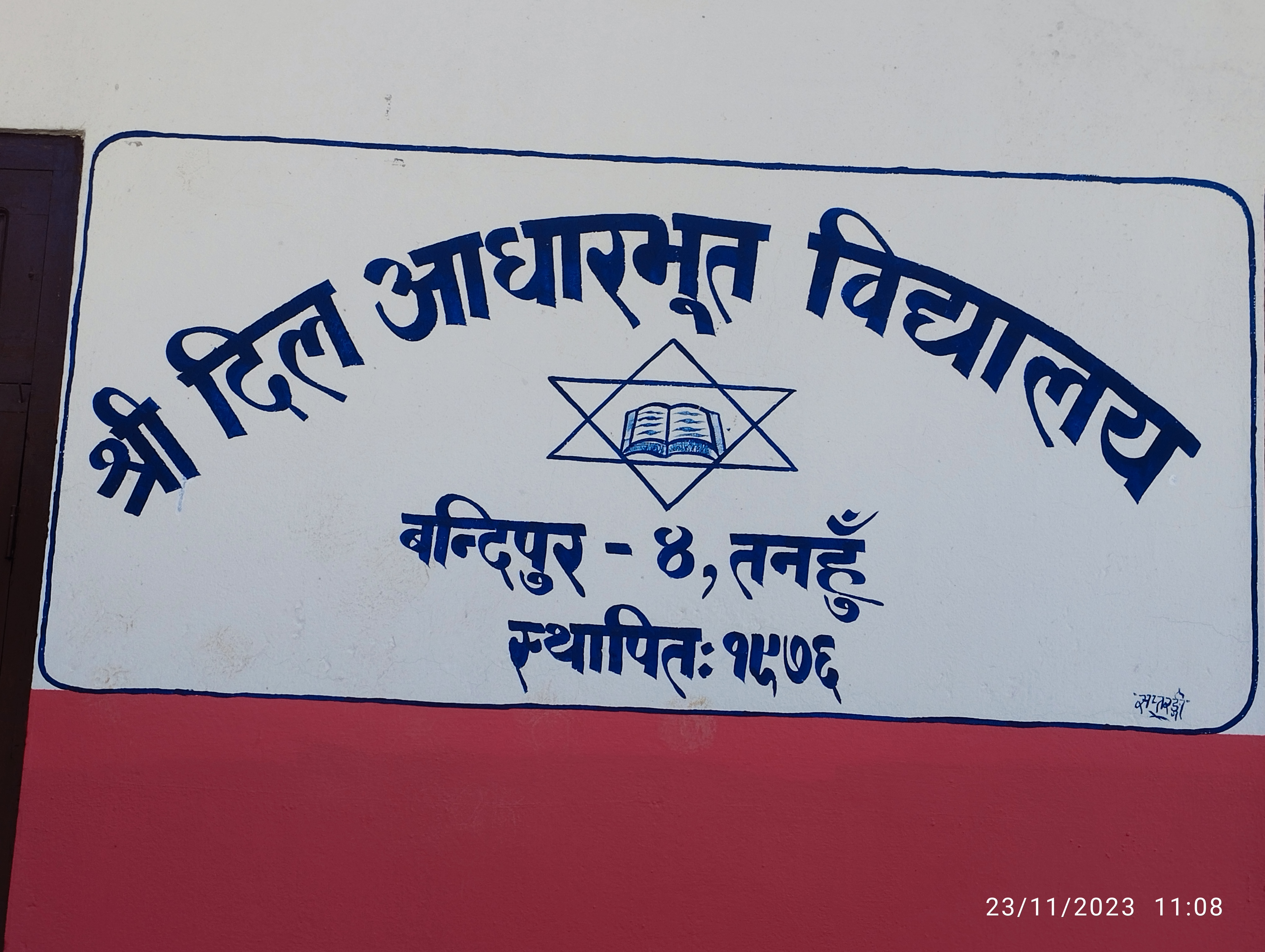
Dil Primary School's Board Showing Establishment Year

== Social organizations ==
Bandipur hosts number of social organizations like social youth forum, public library, child club. Padma library is one of the oldest libraries in Nepal, established in Rana regime itself. Many social organizations have arisen and faded, Tindhara Youth Cultural Group (TYC-Group) is the only active youth club (social youth forum) established in 1998. Initially it was a loose forum and was registered under District Administrative Office in 2003.

Hoste Haise Child Development Society is another social organization working in child development and children right sector. Other social organizations to be named are Bhanu School Operation Committee, Bandipur Hospital Development Committee, Raniban Social Committee, Tindhara Development Committee.

== Eco-Cultural Project ==
Bandipur Eco Cultural Tourism Project (BECT-Project) is the project that lift the face of Bandipur as one of the major tourist destinations of Nepal. BECT-Project had assistance of EuropeAid. This project was a part of a European Commission/Asia Urbs-funded partnership project with the two European partner cities: Municipality of Hydra, Greece Hydra (island) and Commune d Riomaggiore, Italy Riomaggiore. Its objectives were to develop and promote Bandipur as a unique tourist destination: enhance, upgrade and conserve the built and natural environment of Bandipur; and support local enterprises to revitalize economic activities, ultimately extending the length of tourists stay in Bandipur.

== Demographics ==
At the time of the 2011 Nepal census, Bandipur Rural Municipality had a population of 20,077. Of these, 56.9% spoke Nepali, 25.0% Gurung, 10.6% Magar, 4.3% Newar, 0.8% Bhujel, 0.5% Hindi, 0.4% Bhojpuri, 0.4% Tamang, 0.2% Urdu, 0.1% Bengali, 0.1% Maithili, 0.1% Rai, 0.1% Sign language, 0.1% Tharu and 0.1% other languages as their first language.

In terms of ethnicity/caste, 28.0% were Gurung, 18.6% Magar, 10.5% Chhetri, 9.6% Hill Brahmin, 9.4% Newar, 6.5% Kami, 5.6% Sarki, 3.9% Gharti/Bhujel, 1.7% Damai/Dholi, 1.3% other Dalit, 1.2% Sanyasi/Dasnami, 0.7% Tamang, 0.6% Musalman, 0.6% Thakuri, 0.3% Kumal, 0.2% Rai, 0.2% Tharu, 0.1% Badi, 0.1% Bengali, 0.1% Chepang/Praja, 0.1% Gaine, 0.1% Ghale, 0.1% Teli, 0.1% Thakali, 0.1% Yadav and 0.4% others.

In terms of religion, 83.5% were Hindu, 12.7% Buddhist, 2.7% Christian, 0.6% Muslim and 0.4% others.

In terms of literacy, 71.8% could read and write, 2.3% could only read and 25.8% could neither read nor write.

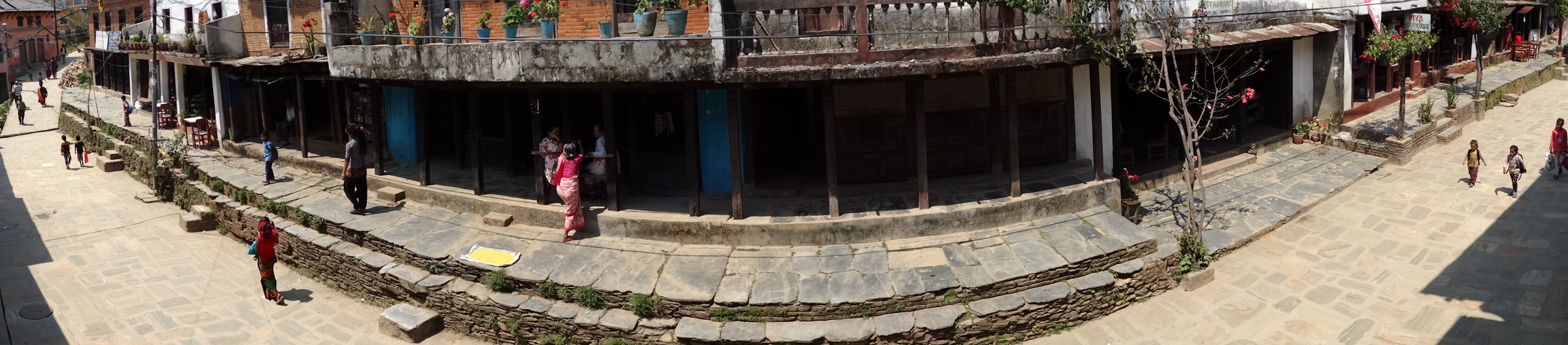
Main Street from Balcony of Newa Guest House in Bandipur, 2014

== Climate ==
Climate data for Bandipur, elevation 965 m (3,166 ft)
Month	Jan	Feb	Mar	Apr	May	Jun	Jul	Aug	Sep	Oct	Nov	Dec	Year
Mean daily maximum °C (°F)	18.4 (65.1)	20.8 (69.4)	25.7 (78.3)	29.7 (85.5)	30.0 (86.0)	30.1 (86.2)	28.3 (82.9)	28.2 (82.8)	27.8 (82.0)	26.7 (80.1)	23.1 (73.6)	19.3 (66.7)	25.7 (78.2)
Daily mean °C (°F)	12.3 (54.1)	14.1 (57.4)	18.7 (65.7)	23.0 (73.4)	24.2 (75.6)	25.2 (77.4)	24.6 (76.3)	24.3 (75.7)	23.7 (74.7)	21.6 (70.9)	16.7 (62.1)	13.1 (55.6)	20.1 (68.2)
Mean daily minimum °C (°F)	6.4 (43.5)	7.5 (45.5)	11.8 (53.2)	16.2 (61.2)	18.6 (65.5)	20.6 (69.1)	20.8 (69.4)	20.6 (69.1)	19.5 (67.1)	16.3 (61.3)	10.6 (51.1)	6.8 (44.2)	14.6 (58.4)
Average precipitation mm (inches)	24.5 (0.96)	23.3 (0.92)	35.9 (1.41)	76.7 (3.02)	200.2 (7.88)	333.8 (13.14)	463.0 (18.23)	376.0 (14.80)	201.9 (7.95)	62.9 (2.48)	10.1 (0.40)	15.9 (0.63)	1,824.2 (71.82)
Source: FAO JICA

== Gallery ==
Bandipur
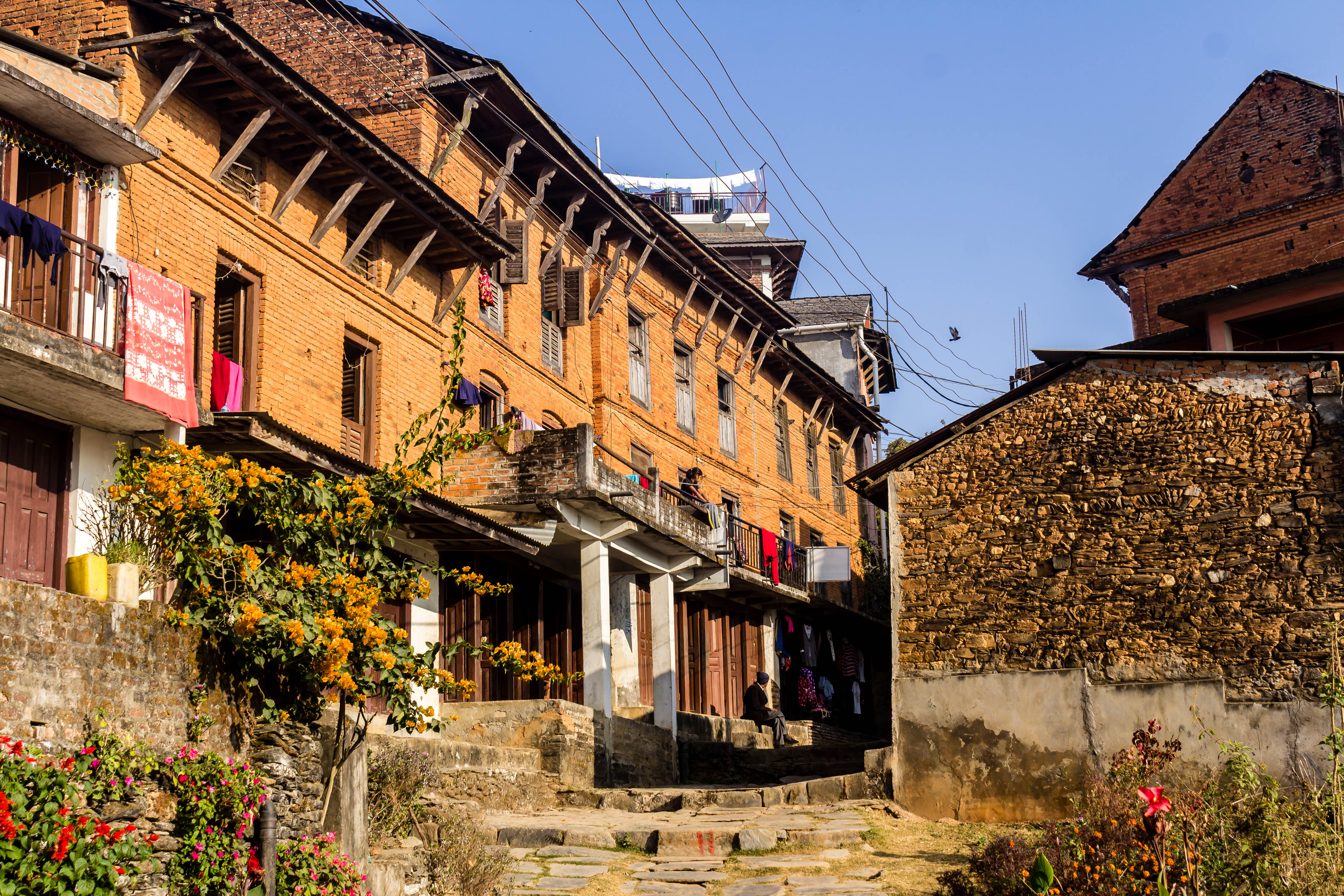
Typical Nepali House in Bandipur, 2018

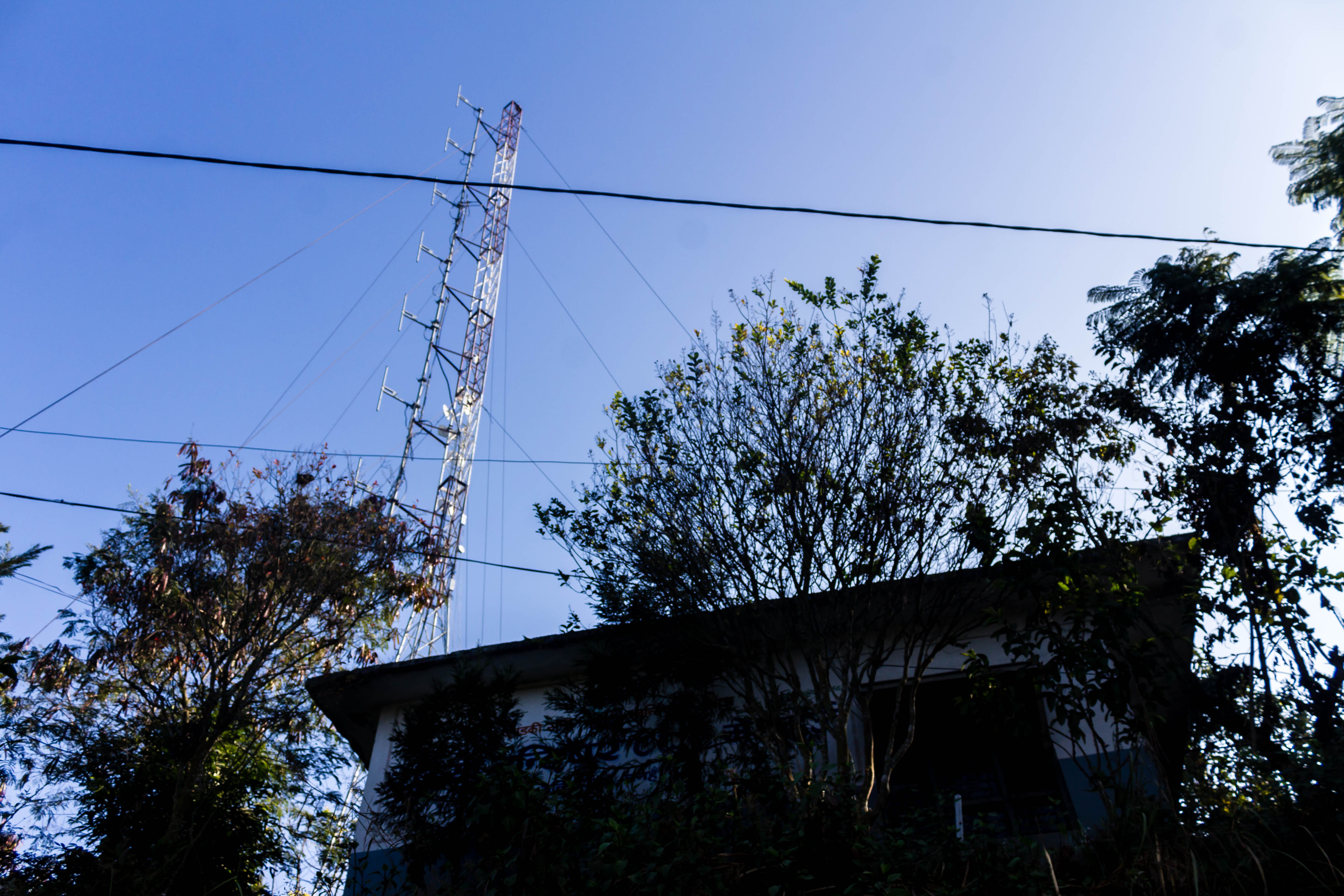
Bandipur Radio Station

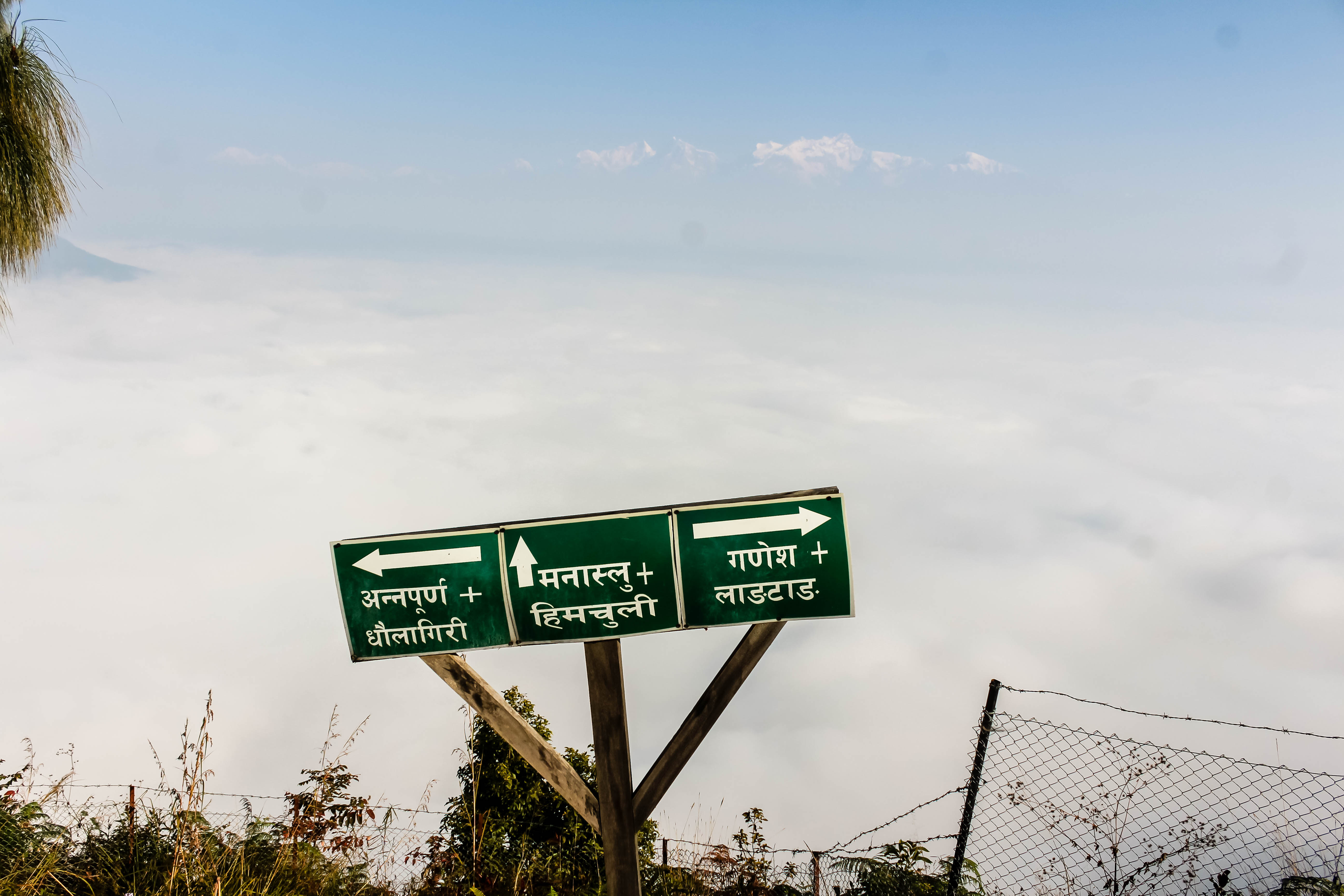
View Point of Bandipur

view from Bandipur

== See also ==
- Khadga Jatra
