= Saint Saviour High School =

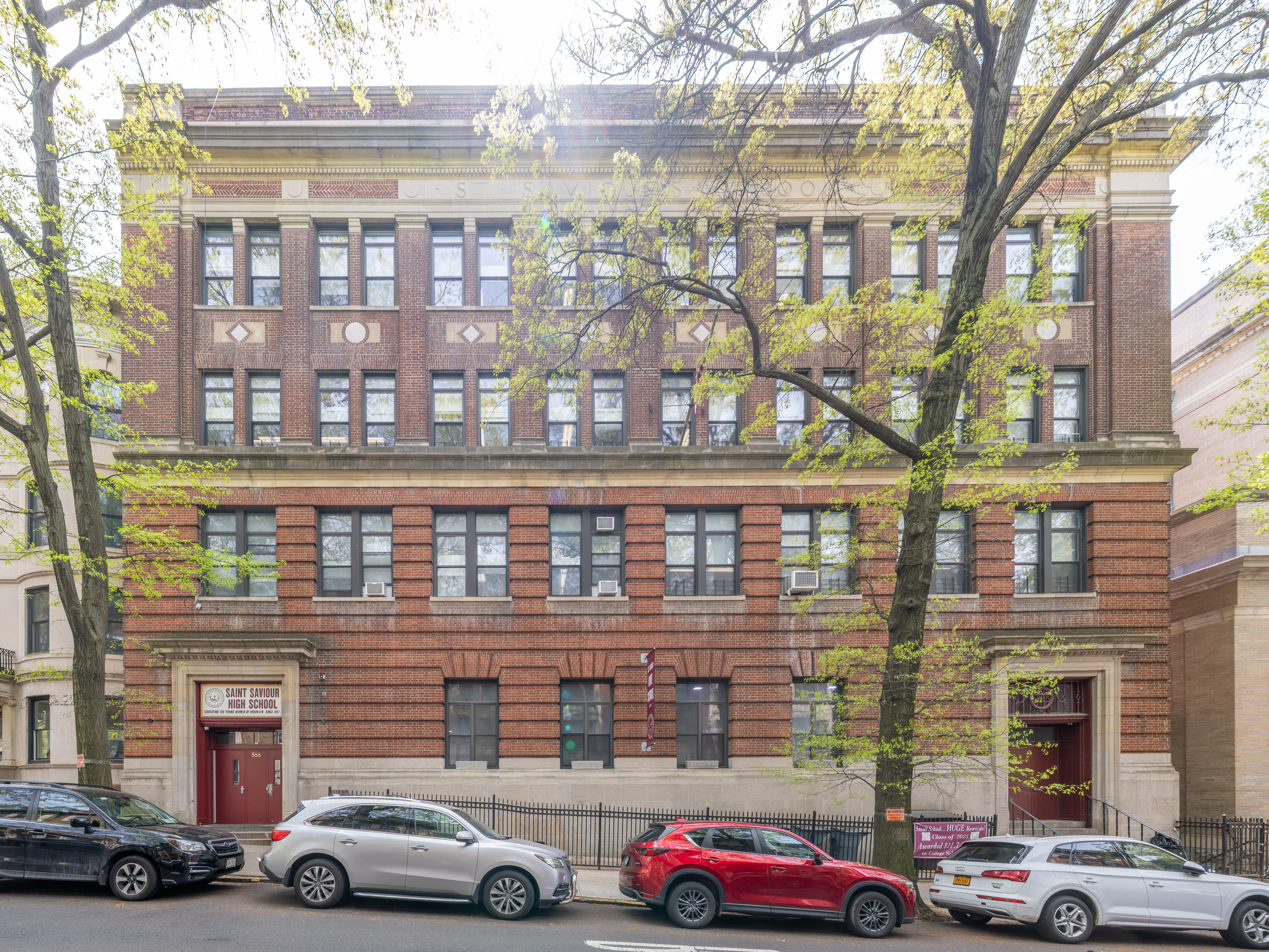
- (2026)

Location
- 588 Sixth Street; New York City (Park Slope, Brooklyn), New York 11215; United States; 40°40′1.5″N 73°58′37.5″W

Information
- Type: Private
- Motto: Pax Quies Ordinis Boni (Peace is the tranquility of good order)
- Religious affiliations: Roman Catholic (School Sisters of Notre Dame)
- Established: 1917
- Principal: Carolann Timpone
- Chaplain: Daniel Murphy
- Grades: 9-12
- Gender: Girls
- Colors: Maroon and White
- Athletics conference: CHSAA
- Mascot: Panda
- Team name: Pandas
- Publication: Voices (literary magazine)
- Newspaper: Skyline
- Yearbook: Thabor
- Athletic Director: Annel Sanchez
- Website: http://www.stsaviour.org

Saint Saviour High School is an all-girls, private, Roman Catholic high school, located in Park Slope, Brooklyn, New York. It is located within the Roman Catholic Diocese of Brooklyn.

Founded under the aegis of the School Sisters of Notre Dame, an international teaching order headquartered in Rome, St. Saviour High School is located in Park Slope. St. Saviour is less than a block from Prospect Park.

== Curriculum ==
The school offers Advanced Placement courses in eight areas: English Literature & Composition; English Language & Composition; American History; European History; World History; Latin; Psychology; Computer Science; Calculus AB; Calculus BC; and Chemistry. College-level courses are offered in conjunction with St. John's University in the following areas: Pre-Calculus & Trigonometry; University Calculus; Latin III; and Spanish. In addition, Honors English, Math, Science, and Social Studies are offered in each of the four years.

Saint Saviour High School was acknowledged as one of the Top 96 High Schools in the United States by a study conducted at the University of Chicago. In 2009, a Saint Saviour student was the recipient of the $2,500 prestigious National Achievement Scholarship Program , an honor that is awarded to fewer than one percent of high school graduates across the nation.

== Extracurricular activities ==
Saint Saviour High School is also known for other extracurricular activities such as their annual Walk-a-thon and Song Contest. Song Contest began in the 1960s, and is an annual competition which takes place during the beginning of the school year. Each grade of students; freshmen, sophomores, juniors, and seniors decide on a theme that has to do with their class and then create a song, banners, and props to go with the theme. On Song Contest night, the students present their songs and creations for friends, families, and classmates and are judged by alumni and faculty. The second annual event is the Walk-a-thon. The Walk-a-thon began in the 1990s and is the first official event of the school year. The students are sponsored through donations or pledges that they receive. The goal is for each student to raise $75. The walk takes place at Prospect Park in Brooklyn.

=== Sports teams ===
- Varsity Basketball
- Varsity Swimming
- Varsity Softball
- Varsity Volleyball
- JV Basketball
- JV Softball
- Tennis
- JV Volleyball
- Soccer
- Boosters
- Cheerleaders
