= Maria Antonina Kratochwil =

Polish Roman Catholic religious sister and martyr

Maria Anna Kratochwil
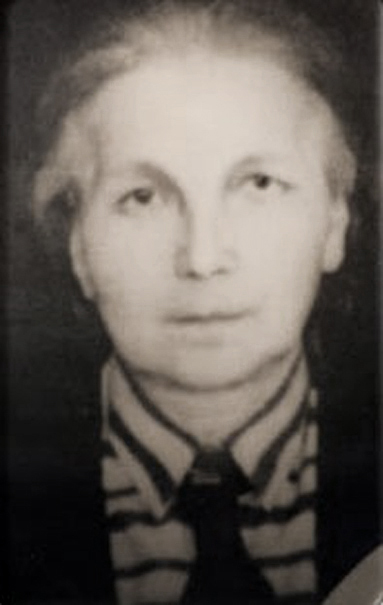

Martyr
- Born: 21 August 1881; Ostrava, Austria-Hungary (now Czech Republic)
- Died: 2 October 1942 (aged 61); Stanisławów, occupied Poland
- Beatified: June 13, 1999, Warsaw, Poland by Pope John Paul II

Maria Antonina Kratochwil (21 August 1881 – 7 October 1942) was beatified by Pope John Paul II as one of the 108 Martyrs of World War II. She tried to help the Jews survive during the Holocaust. A member of the School Sisters of Notre Dame residing in the Kresy region of the Polish Second Republic before the war began; she was arrested along with her sisters by Nazi Germans a year after Operation Barbarossa of 1941, and singled out for anti-Nazi activities. She was severely beaten while in prison, contracted typhus, and died upon her hasty release.

== Life ==
Maria Antonina was born in Witkowice near Ostrava where her parents arrived in 1879 from Węgierska Górka in the Austrian Partition. In search of sustenance, her father worked at a foundry. In 1885 the family returned to her mother's hometown in Węgierska Górka close to Żywiec, and settled in Bielsko nearby.

In 1901 Maria Antonina entered the Congregation of School Sisters of Notre Dame, a worldwide Roman Catholic order devoted to providing primary, secondary, and post-secondary education. She passed her maturation exams in 1906, and became a professed sister. Ten years before the rebirth of sovereign Poland Kratochwil was sent to Karviná near Cieszyn to teach at a Polish elementary school, twice: between 1906–09, and 1910–17. Already in independent Poland she settled in Lwów in the Kresy region where she taught until 1925. She served as director of a Catholic boarding school there in 1925–32; relocated to the town of Tłumacz to train other sisters as teachers, and returned to Lwów, where she was appointed director of a school for candidates in 1931–39.

=== World War II ===
Following the Soviet invasion of Poland at the beginning of World War II, the NKVD authorities closed down the Polish schools in Lwów and dismissed the sisters. Maria Antonina relocated with her sisters to Mikuliczyn in December 1939 (or February 1940). The Soviets raided the convent in Mikuliczyn, nationalized it, and expelled the sisters; they were prohibited from wearing their religious habits ever again. Lwów was taken over by the Germans in June 1941 at the onset of Operation Barbarossa. A year later, Sister Maria Antonia was arrested by the Gestapo on 9 July 1942, along with six other religious sisters, and thrown into prison in Stanisławów (present-day Ivano-Frankivsk, western Ukraine), a provincial capital with a large Polish Jewish population entrapped in the Stanisławów Ghetto. The sisters were kept in a cell with dozens of other women. Sister Kratochwil intervened against the brutal treatment of Jewish female prisoners by the Gestapo office run by the notorious Holocaust perpetrator SS-Hauptsturmführer Hans Krueger. As punishment for her audacity, Kratochwil was subjected to a torturous beating. Returned to the cell all bloodied, she could no longer lie on her back. The six sisters were released at the end of September 1942, after weeks of interrogations. Maria Antonina died from her injuries on 2 October 1942 in a hospital, five days after her release from prison. She was buried in (the no-longer existing) Sapieżyński Cemetery in Stanisławów. Sister Kratochwil was declared patron of Shalom at the 3rd International Shalom meeting held in El Salvador in August 2000. A short book was published about her life in 2001.

Enduring inhumane conditions (hunger, beating, tortures, scoffing) she gave witness to Christian love, faith, and forgiveness; she uplifted her Sisters and lay co-prisoners. Five days after release from prison, she died from the consequence of tortures and the illness of typhus.
