= Kyoto Notre Dame University =

Catholic women's university in Kyoto, Japan

Coordinates: 35°3′2.4″N 135°46′21.9″E

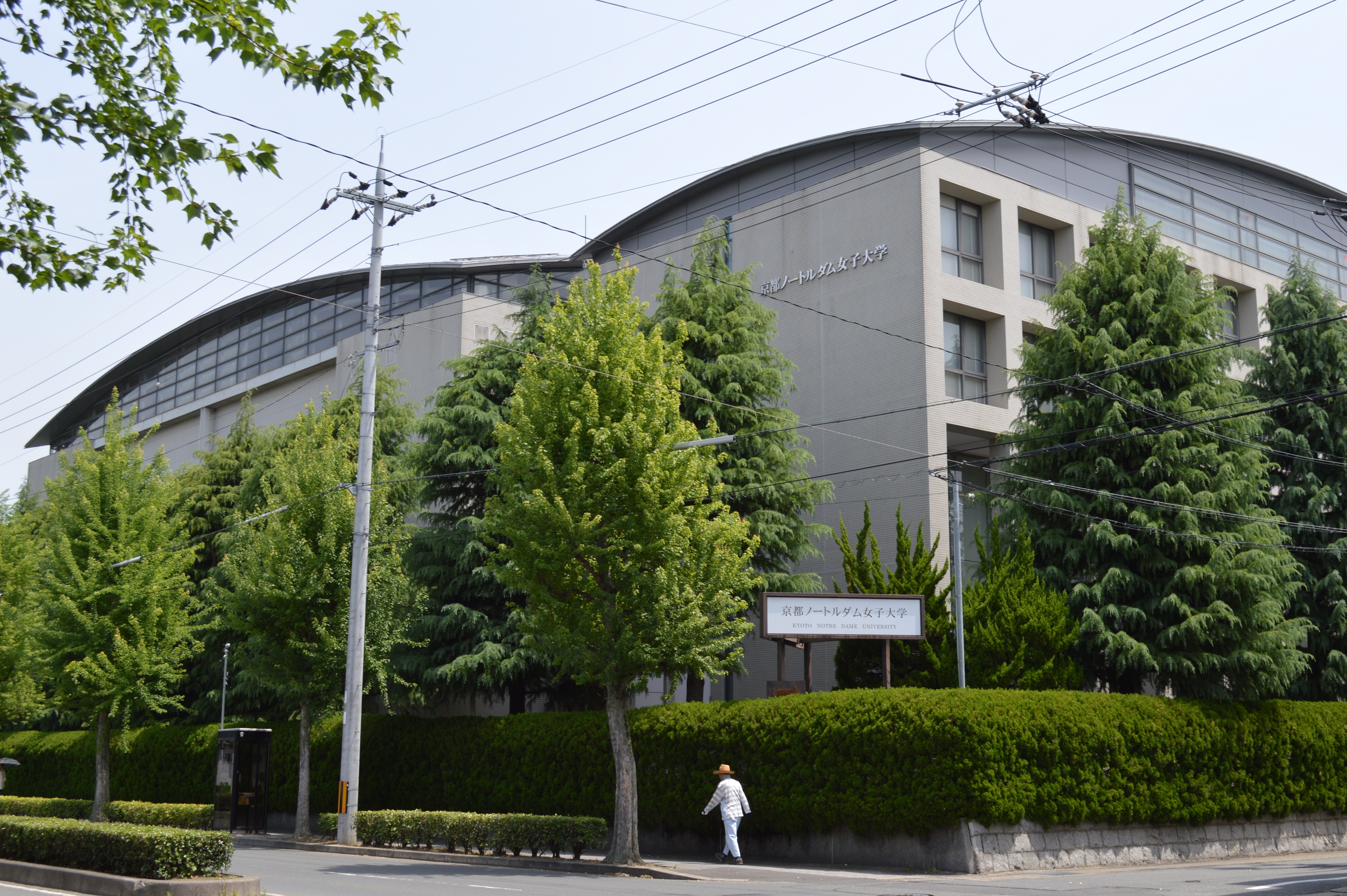
Unison Hall

Kyoto Notre Dame University (京都ノートルダム女子大学), also known as KNDU, is a small private university for women in Sakyo-ku, Kyoto, Japan. This is one of several Catholic universities in Japan. Notre Dame means “Our Lady” in French.

== Overview ==
KNDU is located within a residential area in Kyoto city. Kyoto Botanical Garden, Kyoto concert hall, Shimogamo-jinja shrine, and Daimonji-Yama are also near KNDU. The university ranking is currently 491 of 696 based on all Japanese universities. KNDU gives certificates for teachers, librarians, and museum curators within each of its respected departments. KNDU also welcomes students from all over the world. A significant number of foreign students come from China, while other countries such as Taiwan, South Korea, Hong Kong, Malaysia, Vietnam, Myanmar, Indonesia, and the Philippines are also represented.

== Mission ==
The motto of the university is “Virtue and Knowledge.” This means KNDU teaches not only knowledge, but also morals or a sense of values. The mission faiths for students are respect, communication, sympathy, and action. KNDU also emphasizes “Virtue and Knowledge.” The goal of KNDU is “Be a lady.” This means that all students will be cultured and refined as represented by Our Lady (the Virgin Mary).

== History ==
KNDU was founded by the School Sisters of Notre Dame. In 1948, the Kyoto Catholic Church asked the School Sisters of Notre Dame about founding a school for women. In turn, the four sisters came to Kyoto and founded a junior high school. Not long after that, in 1961, Notre Dame University was subsequently founded with the inclusion of the Department of English and Literature in Sakyo-ku, Kyoto, Japan. The university name officially changed to Kyoto Notre Dame University in 1994.

KNDU established the Department of Life and Culture in 1963, while the Department of Cross-Cultural Studies and the Department of Social Science and Welfare were established in 2000. The "Department of Life and Culture" became the Department of Psychology in 2005.

In 1979, a successful study abroad program was initiated. The first study abroad students studied at the Notre Dame of Maryland University in the USA.

In 2009, it was accredited by the Japanese University Accreditation Association.

== Departments ==
There are four main departments at KNDU.

=== The Department of English and Literature ===
KNDU offers English teacher certification, librarian certification as well as museum curator certification. In addition, KNDU has a special airline industry program with ANA (All Nippon Airways). This particular program teaches students about business manners, hospitality, and the airline industry. It is mostly held for students who want to be flight attendants, however, all students in the Department of English and Literature can take this program.

=== The Department of Cross-Cultural Studies ===
KNDU offers Japanese teacher certification, librarian certification, museum curator certification and social worker certification.

=== The Department of Social Science and Welfare ===
KNDU offers home economics teacher certification, nursery teacher certification, librarian certification, museum curator certification and social worker certification.

=== The Department of Psychology ===
KNDU offers elementary school teacher certification, nursery school teacher certification, child psychologist certification, librarian certification, museum curator certification and social worker certification.

== Partner Universities ==
KNDU has many partner programs for study abroad such as accredited semester abroad programs, academic exchange programs, short-term overseas programs, and overseas internships. Additionally, it has many partner universities all over the world including the USA, The United Kingdom, Canada, Ireland, Australia, New Zealand, South Korea, Vietnam, Thailand, China, and Denmark.
