= St. James's Church, Munich =

Church in Munich, Germany

Coordinates: 48°08′01″N 11°34′18″E

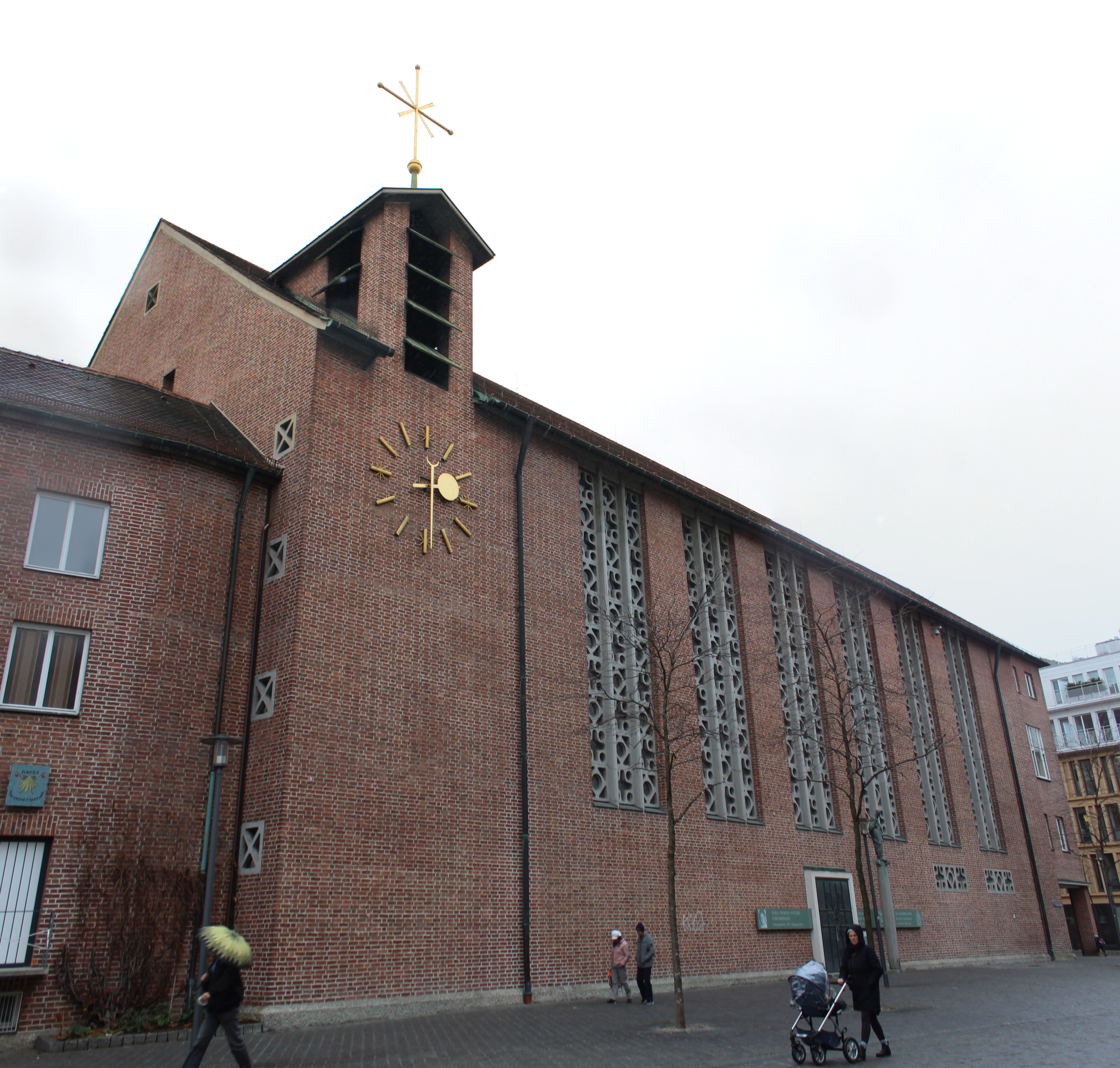
St. James's Church

Saint James's Church (German: Sankt Jakob am Anger), is a church in Munich. It serves the School Sisters of Our Blessed Lady as a monastery church.

The church contains the grave of Blessed Maria Theresia Gerhardinger.
