= Notre Dame High School (St. Louis County, Missouri) =

Catholic school in Missouri, United States

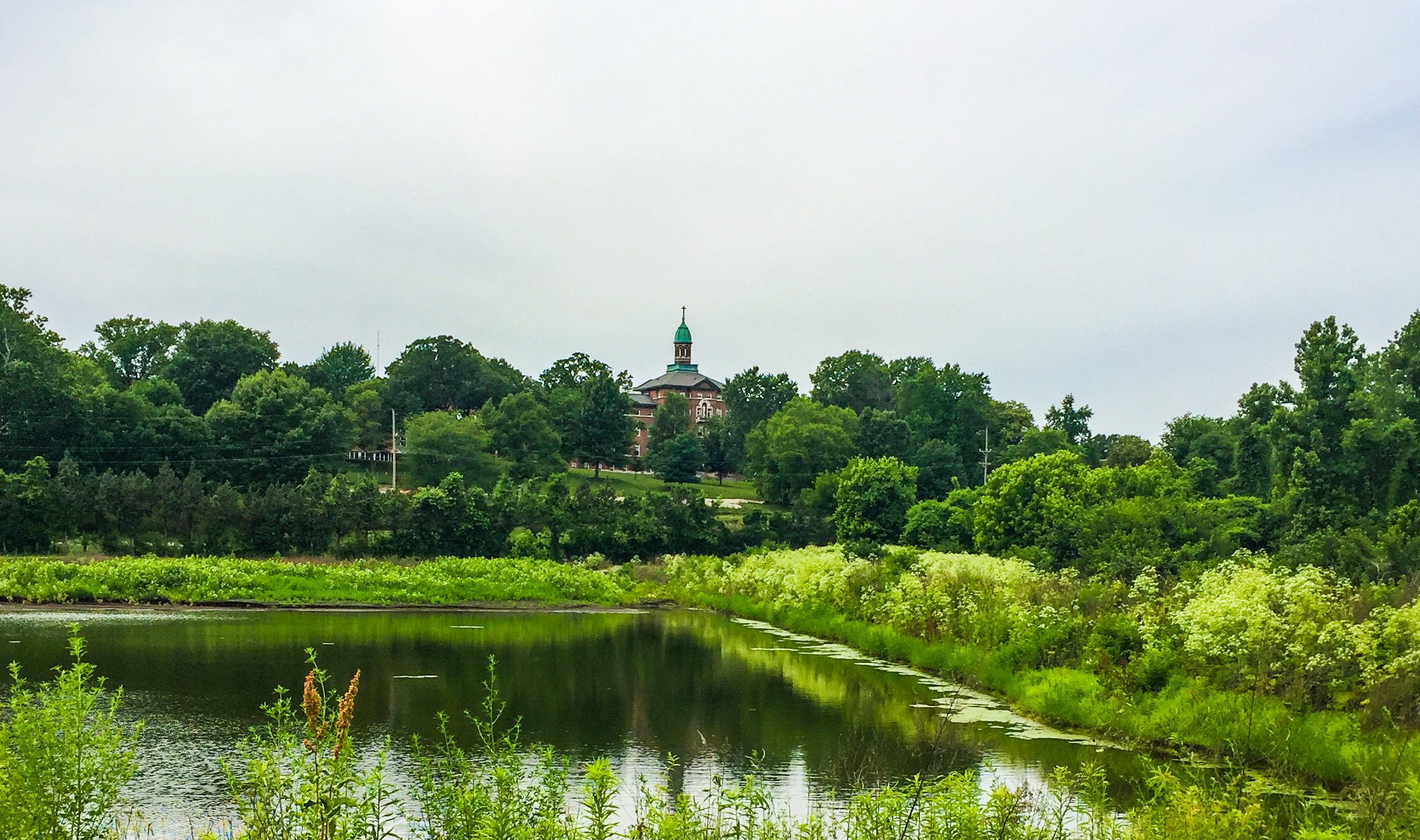
- Notre Dame High School as seen from the Mississippi River Greenway, June 2018

Location
- 320 East Ripa Avenue; Lemay (St. Louis address), St. Louis County, Missouri 63125; United States; 38°31′25″N 90°16′19″W

Information
- Type: Private high school
- Religious affiliation: Roman Catholic
- Established: 1934; 92 years ago
- President: Mark Bayens
- Principal: Amy Bush
- Grades: 9–12
- Gender: Girls
- Student to teacher ratio: 10:1
- Campus size: 43 acres (170,000 m^{2})
- Colors: Royal blue and white
- Nickname: Rebels
- Accreditation: Cognia
- Publication: The Rebellion
- Athletic Director: Dan Grummich
- Website: ndhs.net

Notre Dame High School is a Roman Catholic, private, all-girls school located in Lemay, St. Louis County, Missouri. just south of St. Louis city, on the 43-acre grounds of the motherhouse of the School Sisters of Notre Dame on the Mississippi River. While its roots go back to 1897, its present form and name date to 1934.

== History ==
In 1897 the School Sisters of Notre Dame founded Sancta Maria in Ripa (translation: Saint Mary on the Bank) High School so that girls who were considering joining their congregation could complete their high school education. This was at their motherhouse just south of the city of St. Louis.

In 1925, Sancta Maria was accredited by the North Central Association as a four-year high school. In 1934 it extended its services to those not aspiring to be religious sisters, and changed its name to Notre Dame High School. Classes were held in the motherhouse until 1955 when the current school was built.

Around 1960 enrollment exceeded 500 young ladies. Innovations included advanced college credit courses, more electives, and modular scheduling. In 1977 with the closing of Notre Dame College on campus the high school acquired that building to house its science, fine arts, and counseling departments. In 1996 the high school became a part of the newly formed Notre Dame Ministry Corporation.

The high school has over 7,500 alumnae in 46 states and 8 countries, and one in seven faculty members are the Sisters. All of its graduates pursue higher education.

== Activities ==
Activity groups include: Student Council, Theater, Rebel Writers, A Cappella Group, and clubs for art, for science, for internet, and for Chinese. For outreach there are the Earth Club, Shalom Club, Library Guild, and Harry Potter Club. There are also the National, Hispanic, and Journalism Honor Societies.

The school sponsors 13 sports: basketball, softball, soccer, track, field hockey, cross country, golf, tennis, volleyball, swimming, racquetball, cheerleading, and lacrosse. Excelling in soccer, its goalkeeper was named best in the state in 2016. It also has a competitive cheerleading group.

== Notable alumnae ==
- Kendra Kassebaum, 1991, theater actress most commonly known for her role as Glinda in the first national tour of Wicked (musical).
