= Baspani, Bandipur, Tanahun District =

Nepalese village

Coordinates: 27.89317°N 84.38683°E

Baspani Village (बासपानी) is one of the villages of Bandipur Rural Municipality, Tanahun District, Nepal. Baspani is very popular for its orange productions.
