= Rural Municipality of Reford No. 379 =

Rural municipality in Saskatchewan, Canada

Reford No. 379
- Rural municipality
- Rural Municipality of Reford No. 379
- Location of the RM of Reford No. 379 in Saskatchewan
- Coordinates: 52.246°N 108.685°W
- Country: Canada
- Province: Saskatchewan
- Census division: 13
- SARM division: 6
- Formed: December 12, 1910

Government
  - Reeve: Gerald Gerlinsky
  - Governing body: RM of Reford No. 379 Council
  - Administrator: Sherry Huber
  - Office location: Wilkie

Area (2016)
  - Land: 707.06 km^{2} (273.00 sq mi)

Population (2016)
  - Total: 257
  - Density: 0.4/km^{2} (1.0/sq mi)
- Time zone: CST
  - Summer (DST): CST
- Area codes: 306 and 639

The Rural Municipality of Reford No. 379 (2016 population: 257) is a rural municipality (RM) in the Canadian province of Saskatchewan within Census Division No. 13 and SARM Division No. 6.

== History ==
The RM of Reford No. 379 incorporated as a rural municipality on December 12, 1910.

== Geography ==
=== Communities and localities ===
The following urban municipalities are surrounded by the RM.

Villages

- Landis

The following unincorporated communities are within the RM.

Localities

- Brass
- Cathkin
- Cavell (dissolved as a village, January 1, 1943)
- Leipzig (dissolved as a village, February 1, 1984)
- Reford
- St. Alphege
- Wolfe

== Demographics ==
Population history (1981–2016)
Year	Pop.	±%
1981	558	—
1986	511	−8.4%
1991	417	−18.4%
1996	367	−12.0%
2001	329	−10.4%
2006	296	−10.0%
2011	235	−20.6%
2016	257	+9.4%
Source: Statistics Canada via Saskatchewan Bureau of Statistics

In the 2021 Census of Population conducted by Statistics Canada, the RM of Reford No. 379 had a population of 222 living in 90 of its 110 total private dwellings, a change of −13.6% from its 2016 population of 257. With a land area of 695.85 km^{2} (268.67 sq mi), it had a population density of 0.3/km^{2} (0.8/sq mi) in 2021.

In the 2016 Census of Population, the RM of Reford No. 379 recorded a population of 257 living in 99 of its 119 total private dwellings, a 9.4% change from its 2011 population of 235. With a land area of 707.06 km^{2} (273.00 sq mi), it had a population density of 0.4/km^{2} (0.9/sq mi) in 2016.

== Government ==
The RM of Reford No. 379 is governed by an elected municipal council and an appointed administrator that meets on the second Thursday of every month. The reeve of the RM is Gerald Gerlinsky while its administrator is Sherry Huber. The RM's office is located in Wilkie.

== Transportation ==
- Highway 14
- Highway 656
- Highway 657
- Highway 659
- Highway 784
- Canadian Pacific Railway
- Canadian National Railway
- Wilkie Airport

== See also ==
- List of rural municipalities in Saskatchewan
