= Leipzig, Saskatchewan =

Community in Saskatchewan, Canada

Coordinates: 52°11′07″N 108°40′46″W

Leipzig is a hamlet in the Rural Municipality of Reford No. 379, Saskatchewan, Canada. It previously held the status of a village until February 1, 1984. The hamlet is located 27 kilometres (17 mi) south of the town of Wilkie on Highway 657. It is named after the German city of Leipzig. The streets are also named after other German cities.

The village site houses the Leipzig Convent building; originally built as a convent and boarding schooling; the building now houses Prairie Sky Recovery Centre.

== History ==
Initially, Leipzig was incorporated as a village. It was restructured as a hamlet under the jurisdiction of the RM of Reford on February 1, 1984.

== See also ==
- St. Joseph's Colony, Saskatchewan
- List of communities in Saskatchewan
- List of hamlets in Saskatchewan
