= Keshavtar =

Keshavtar केशवटार
- Village development committee
- Location in Nepal Keshavtar (Nepal)
- Coordinates: 27.92°N 84.34°E
- Country: Nepal
- Zone: Gandaki Zone
- District: Tanahu District

Population (1991)
  - Total: 8,385
- Time zone: UTC+5:45 (Nepal Time)

Keshavtar is a village development committee in Tanahu District in the Gandaki Zone of central Nepal. At the time of the 1991 Nepal census it had a population of 8,385 people living in 1,566 individual households.
