= Manas River =

River in Bhutan, China and India

Manas River Drangme Chhu
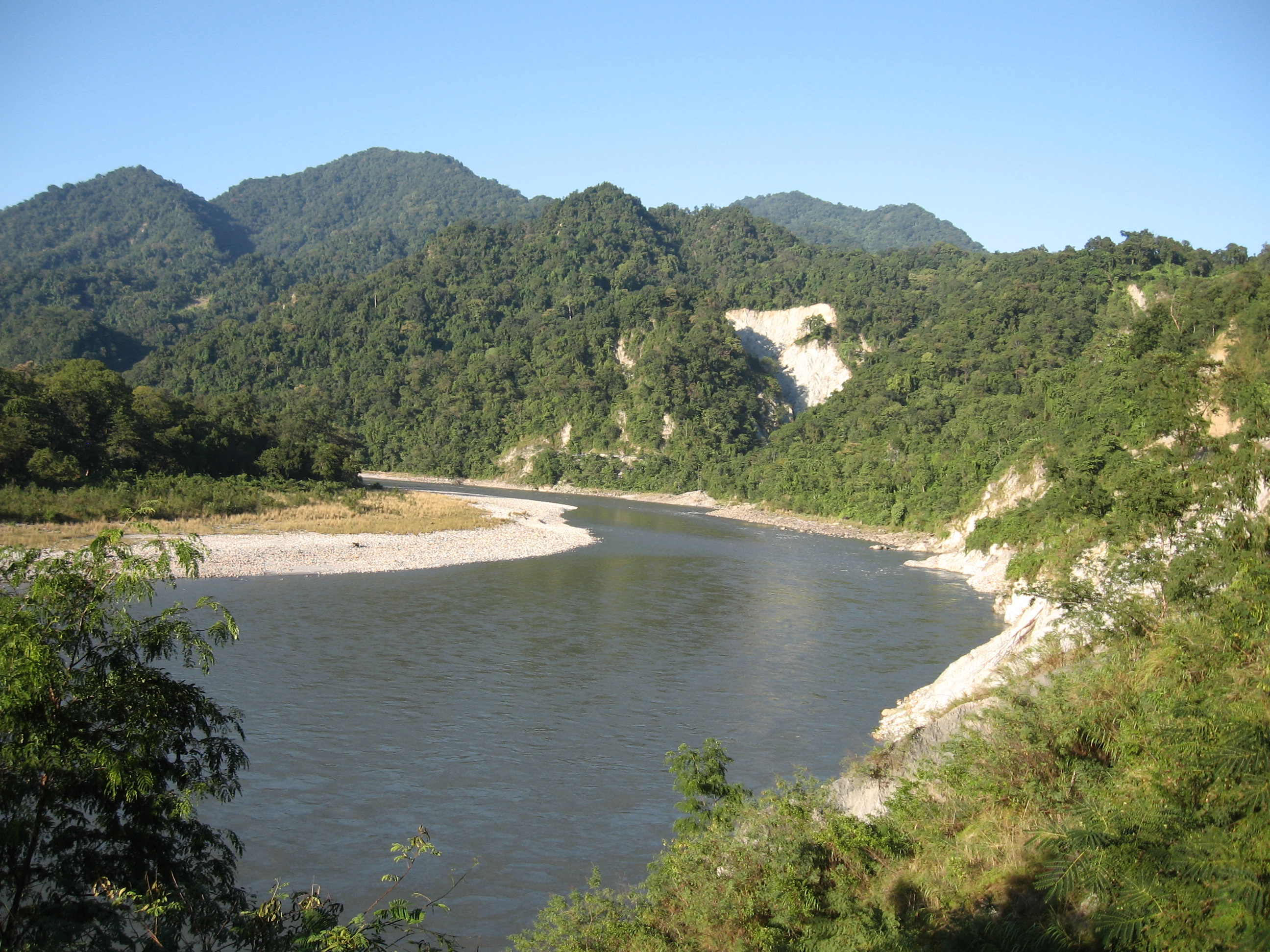
- Manas River on the Assam-Bhutan border.

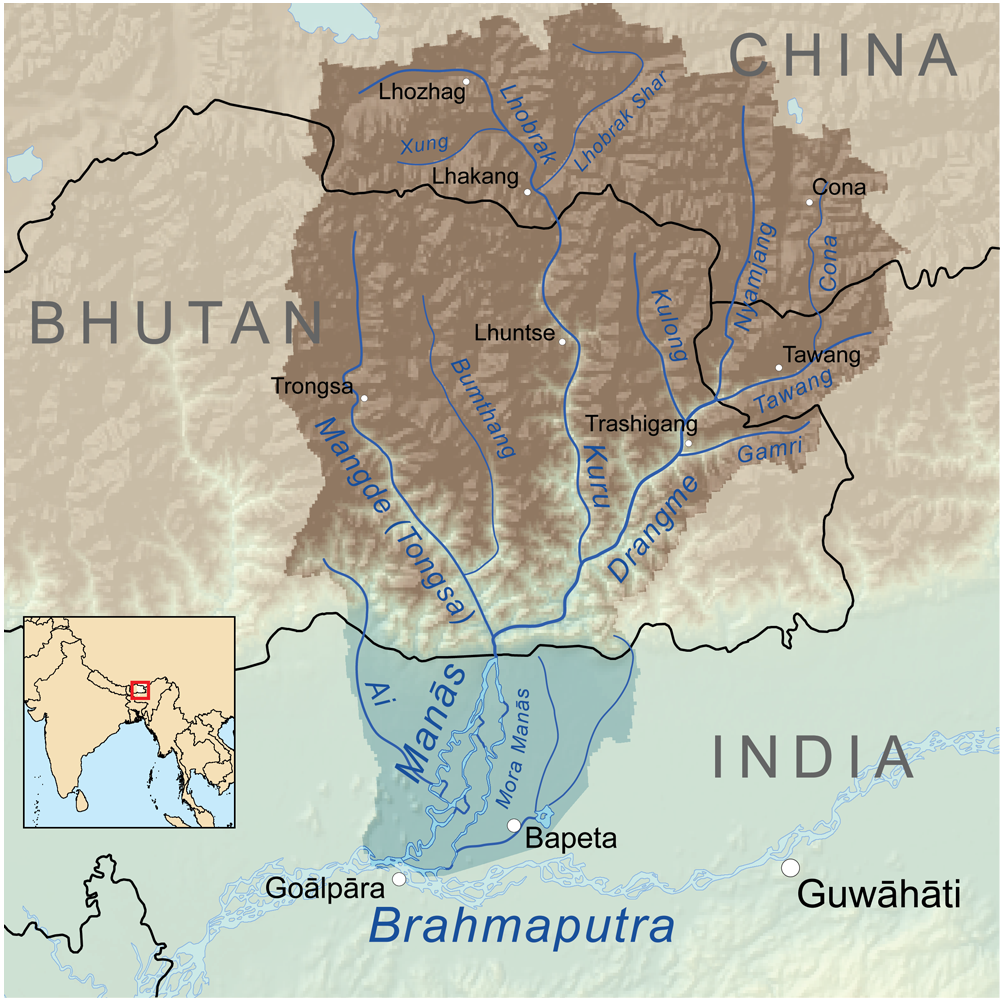
- Manas River drainage basin

- Mouth of Manas river in Assam, India Manas River (India)

Location
- Country: India, Bhutan, China

Physical characteristics
- Length: Manas–Drangme Chhu–Nyamjang Chu 400 km (250 mi)
- Basin size: 41,350 km^{2} (15,970 mi^{2})
- Discharge
  - location: Near mouth
  - average: (Period: 1998–2007)1,667 m^{3}/s (58,900 cu ft/s)
- Discharge
  - location: Mathanguri, Manas National Park
  - average: (Period: 1955–1974)1,224 m^{3}/s (43,200 cu ft/s)
  - minimum: 206 m^{3}/s (7,300 cu ft/s)
  - maximum: 7,030 m^{3}/s (248,000 cu ft/s)

Basin features
- Progression: Brahmaputra → Padma → Meghna → Bay of Bengal
- River system: Ganges River
- Tributaries
  - left: Drangme Chhu, Bhelengi
  - right: Tongsa, Aie

The Manas River (pron: [ˈmʌnəs]), known in Bhutan as the Drangme Chhu, is a transboundary river in the Himalayan foothills between southern Bhutan, India, and China. It is the largest of Bhutan's four major river systems, with the other three being the Amo Chu or Torsa River, the Wang Chu or Raidak, and the Puna Tshang Chu or Sankosh. It is met by three other major streams before it again debouches into India in western Assam. The river flows for a total length of 400 km (250 mi), including through Tibet for 24 km (15 mi), Bhutan for 272 km (169 mi), and Assam for 104 km (65 mi) before it joins the Brahmaputra at Jogighopa. A major tributary of the Manas, the Aie, joins it in Assam at Bangpari.

The Manas river valley has two major forest reserves, namely Royal Manas National Park (43,854 ha (108,370 acres), established in 1966) in Bhutan and the contiguous Manas Wildlife Sanctuary (established at 391,000 ha (970,000 acres) in 1955 and increased to 95,000 ha (230,000 acres) in December 1985), encompassing a Project Tiger reserve, an elephant reserve and a biosphere reserve, which constitutes a UNESCO World Heritage Site declared in December 1985.

== Geography ==
The Manas River drains 41,350 km^{2} (15,970 mi^{2}) of eastern Bhutan and northeast India. It has three major branches: the Drangme Chhu, Mangde Chhu, and Bumthang (Chamkhar) Chhu that cover most of eastern Bhutan, with the Trongsa and Bumthang valley also forming part of its catchment. The area drained in Bhutan territory is 18,300 km^{2} and is bounded by the geographical coordinates 26.217°N 90.633°E. A part of the main stem of the river rises in southern Tibet at an altitude of 4,500 m (14,800 ft) before entering India in the Tawang district at the northwestern corner of Arunachal Pradesh.

The river flows through V-shaped gorges in a southwesterly direction between two ranges of the Lower Himalayas in Bhutan and enters Assam in the south-central foothills of the Himalayas. The valley widens in the foothills, where it is marked by the formation of swamps and marshes in the river's alluvial plain. The upper catchment is largely snowbound while the middle and lower catchment are thickly forested.

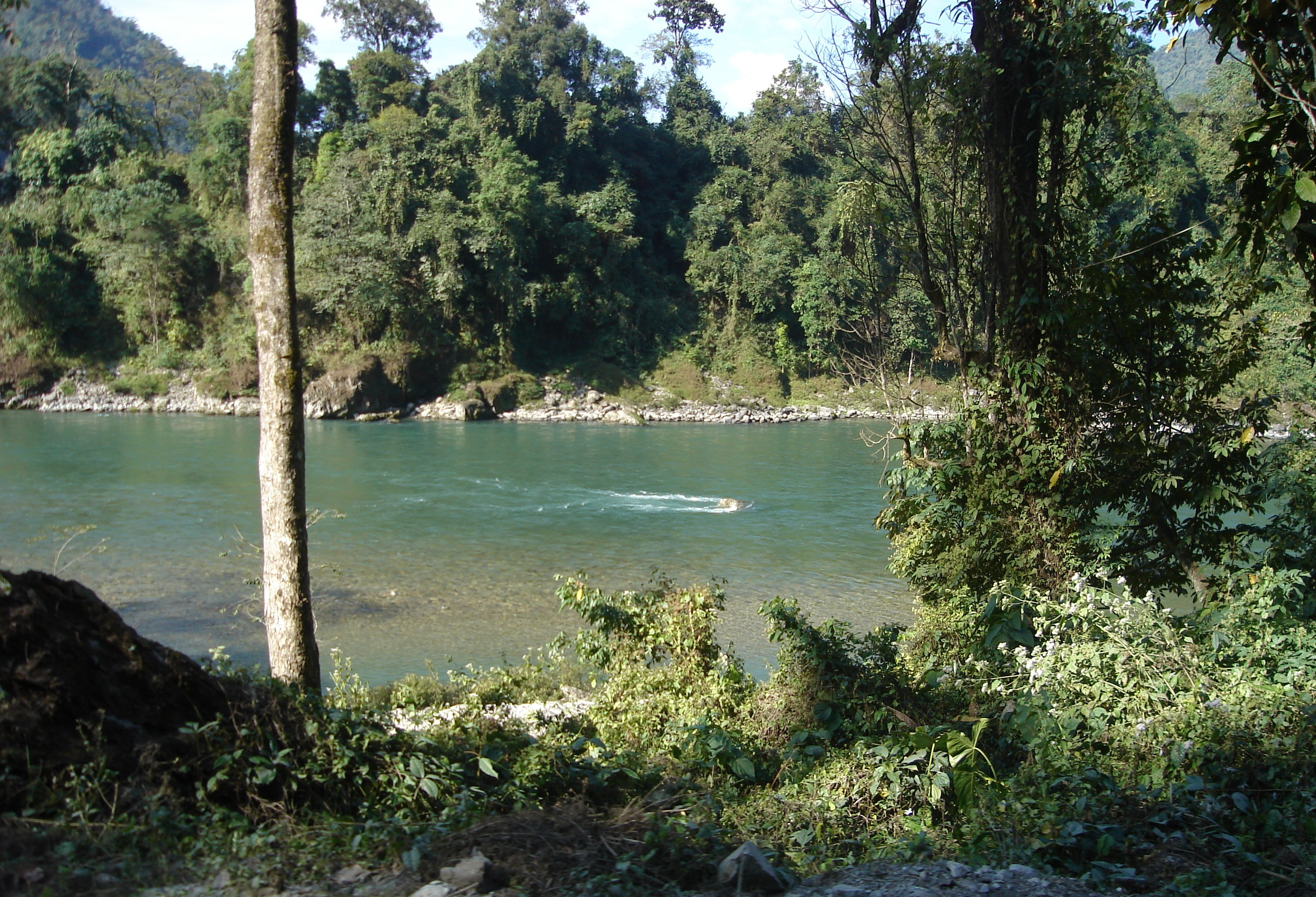
Clear waters of the Manas River in the sanctuary

The total combined length of all tributaries of the river system in Bhutan amounts to 3,200 km (2,000 mi). The main stem of the river, the Tawang Chu, originates in the Tawang district of Arunachal Pradesh in India and after flowing in a southwesterly direction enters Bhutan near Trashigang. At Duksum in Trashi Yangtse, the Tawang Chu is joined by the Kholong Chu, which rises in the northern Himalaya snow ranges of Bhutan. Further downstream, the Gamri Chu, flowing down from Sakten, joins it. At Trashigang, the width of the riverbed is about 550 m (1,800 ft) and the riverbed elevation is 606 m (1,988 ft).

The Lhobrak, or Kuri Chhu, is the main central tributary of the Manas. It is the only river that rises north of the Great Himalayas and it joins the Manas at Gongri Zomsa between Monggar and Pema Gatshel districts. Further downstream, at Panbang in Zhemgang District, the combined stream joins with the Mangde Chhu. Here the riverbed elevation is 121 m (397 ft). The Mangde Chu is formed by two rivers, namely the Mangde Chu, which rises in northern Bhutan near Kula Kangri Peak where the elevation is 5,666 m (18,589 ft), and the Bumthang River, also called the Chamkhar Chu.

After flowing in a generally southwesterly direction for about 29 km (18 mi) in Bhutan, the Aie River, also known as the Mow River in Sarpang District in Bhutan, joins the Manas in the Goalpara District of Assam at the village of Agrong. From here, it follows a meandering course for about 75 km (47 mi) and empties into the Brahmaputra near Jogighopa. The Aie River, which rises in the Black Mountains at an altitude of about 4,915 m (16,125 ft) near the village of Bangpari, is about 110 km (68 mi) in length. The total length of the Manas, as measured along its longest tributary the Kur, is 376 km (234 mi), of which about 104 km (65 mi) lies in India. About 270 km (170 mi) of this length are in hilly or mountainous topography, with the balance in the plains. The Manas River is the largest north bank tributary of the Brahmaputra, with a recorded maximum discharge of 7,641 cubic metres, and contributes 5.48% of the total average volume of the Brahmaputra.

The river valley in the foothills is surrounded by small meadows located among thickly deciduous forested foothills with many rivulets, streams and natural drainage channels related to the river system. In the lower reaches of the river, there are many smooth sandy stretches populated with trees. The lowlands north of the confluence with the Brahmaputra, known as the Terai or Duars (a Sanskrit word meaning "passes" or "gates"), encompass a 15–30 km (9.3–18.6 mi) stretch of the outermost foothills and are very fertile. Each Duar (with elevation varying from 100 m (330 ft) to near sea level as they join the Brahmaputra) is named after a stream or hemmed between two streams. The fertile lands have been developed into tea estates and paddy fields.

== Hydrology ==
The Manas catchment is almost wholly mountainous, rising within the space of 140 km (87 mi) from an elevation of about 100 m (330 ft) near the Indian border to the great Himalayan peaks at over 7,500 m (24,600 ft) along the main Himalayan range bordering Bhutan and Tibet. The huge elevation range and varied climatic conditions are reflected in rich diversity of fauna and flora native to the area.

== Climate ==
Climate along the river is extremely varied, ranging from hot, humid subtropical conditions in the south to cold, dry alpine conditions in the north. From May to October, the southwest monsoon brings heavy rainfall—more than 4,000 mm (160 in) in the southern part—and there is a pronounced dry season in winter. Further north, the rainfall is generally scanty, of the order of 600 to 700 mm (24 to 28 in) recorded from June to August. The difference between maximum and minimum river flow in the monsoon season and dry season is said to be as much as 20 times. An average of approximately 2,309 mm of precipitation falls annually over the entire Manas catchment area.

== Protected areas ==
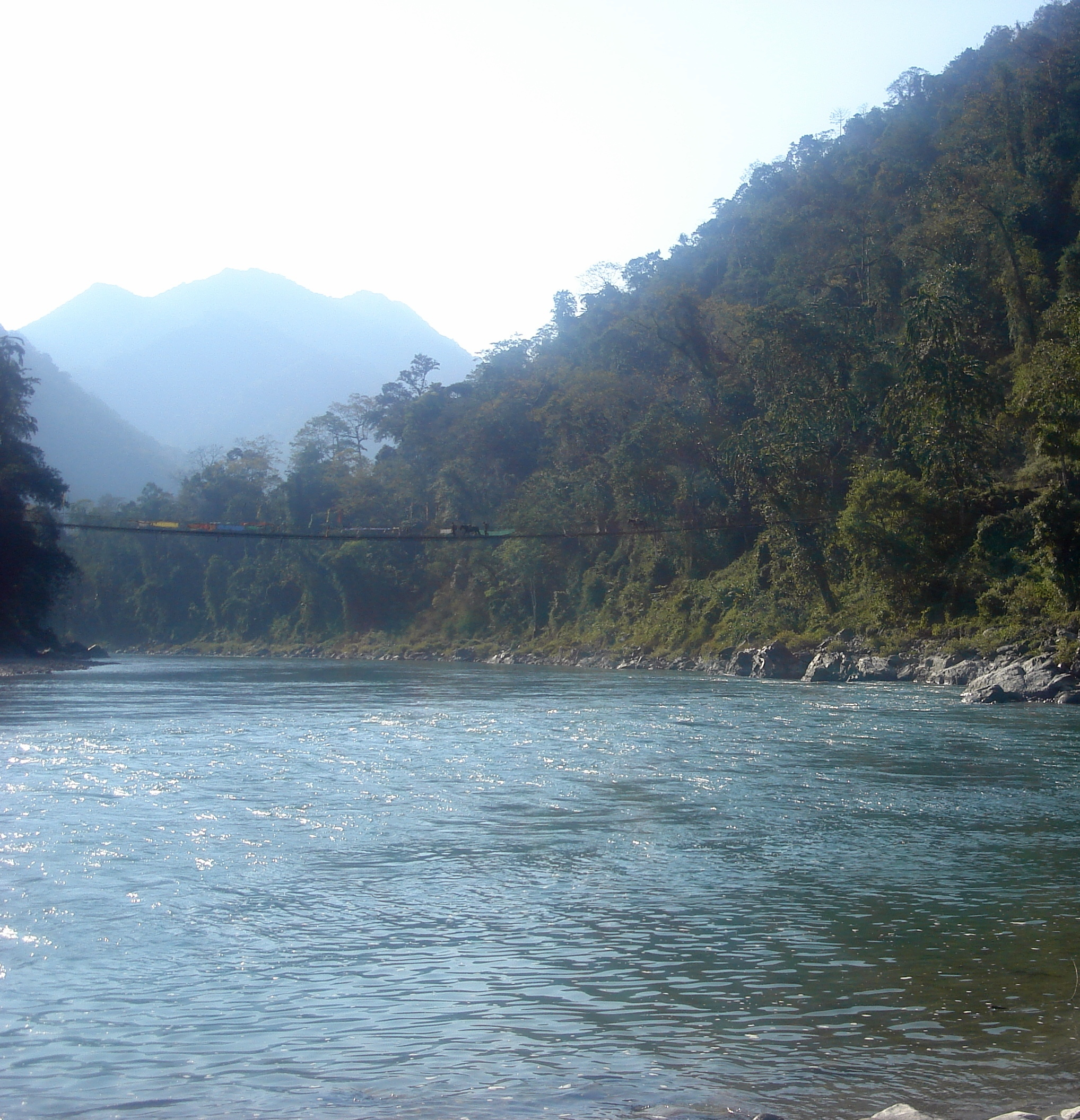
A suspension bridge across the Manas River in a reserved area of the park

Out of the large catchment of the river valley, many protected areas or reserves have been specifically demarcated, both in Bhutan and India, which are declared national parks or sanctuaries. The two forest and wildlife reserves cover an area of 9,938.54 km^{2} (3,837.29 mi^{2}), about 24% of the total catchment area of 41,350 km^{2} (15,970 mi^{2}) of the Manas basin.

=== Royal Manas National Park ===
Royal Manas National Park in southern Bhutan, considered the national heritage of Bhutan, was first declared a wildlife sanctuary and subsequently raised to the status of a national park in 1993. Covering an area of 9,938.54 km^{2} (3,837.29 mi^{2}), the area is 92% forested and is a well-preserved example of a natural Eastern Himalayan ecosystem. The park is bordered to the north by Jigme Singye Wangchuck National Park and to the south by the Manas Tiger Reserve in India. Within Bhutan, biological corridors linked with the park include Phrumsengla National Park in the north, Phibsoo Wildlife Sanctuary in the west, and Jomotsangkha Wildlife Sanctuary in the east. The park features a large diversity of tropical grasslands, moist temperate forests, alpine meadows, and scrublands. The various flora and fauna identified in the park are 45 species of mammals, 366 species of birds, and 900 species of vascular plants. The World Wildlife Fund (WWF) is actively working on a conservation management plan in association with local wildlife authorities to preserve and protect this national heritage. Among the important faunal species living here are the royal Bengal tiger (Panthera tigris tigris), Asian elephant (Elephas maximus), gaur (Bos gaurus), four rare species of golden langur (Trachypithecus geei), pygmy hog (Sus salvanius), hispid hare (Caprolagus hispidus), greater one-horned rhinoceros (Rhinoceros unicornis), and wild Asiatic water buffalo (Bubalus arnee). There are 362 species of birds, out of which four species of hornbills (rufous-necked, wreathed, pied, and great Indian) have been recorded. Apart from the Ganges river dolphin (Platanista gangetica) other aquatic species identified in the Manas river are the deep-bodied mahseer (Tor tor), golden mahseer (Tor putitora), and chocolate mahseer or katle (Acrossocheilus hexangonolepis). Five thousand people live within the park limits in several villages. Tigers, the most revered animal in Bhutan, are estimated to number about 100 and are mostly confined to this national park and the neighbouring Manas National Park in India.

The world's rarest monkeys, the golden langur, which flourish in dense forests with its long tail with a tassel at the end, are found in both Bhutan and India, in the two reserved forest sanctuaries. These monkeys, found in groups, have no hair on their black face but have generous golden ruff on their body. They are found in large numbers – approximately 180 in India and 1,200 in Bhutan, as per counts made in 1978 and 1980 respectively.

=== Manas Wildlife Sanctuary ===
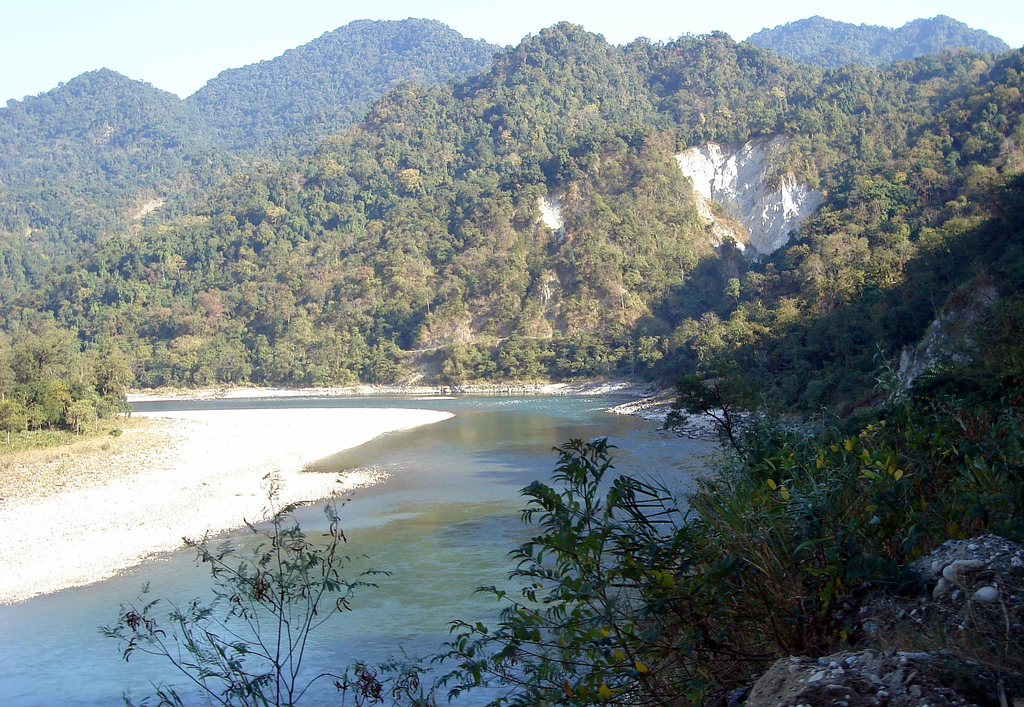
Manas Wildlife Sanctuary in the Manas valley

The Manas Wildlife Sanctuary, located in Assam, is considered one of "Asia's finest wild life reserves" and is a UNESCO World Heritage Site. It is contiguous with Bhutan's Royal Manas National Park to its north. It now encompasses a bioreserve, a tiger reserve, and also an elephant reserve. The park is well forested and also comprises grasslands and marshes. In 1928, the core of the area was designated a sanctuary and in 1978 it was declared a tiger reserve.

The Manas River and its tributary the Hakua flow through the sanctuary. A thick mantle of alluvium is the dominant soil of the terrain. Under subtropical climatic conditions (with 30 mm (1.2 in) of annual rainfall and temperature varying between a maximum of 30 °C (86 °F) and a minimum of 5 °C (41 °F)), the forest consists of the semi-evergreen forest vegetation with mixed deciduous, littorals, and swamps, and interspersed with bamboo and cane. Flooding occurs in large parts of the bioreserve.

The park is managed under several conservation management units such as the Core Zone, the Buffer Zone, and the Economic Zone. The park is known for its rare and endangered endemic wildlife such as tigers and elephants, as well as the Assam roofed turtle, hispid hare, golden and capped langurs, pygmy hog, one-horned rhinoceros, Asiatic buffalo, swamp deer, barking deer, leopard, clouded leopard, marbled cat, sloth bear, hoolock gibbon, wild boar, and river dolphin. The park is home to 22 endangered mammal species. Reptiles include pythons, common Indian crocodiles, gharials, common wolf snakes, cat snakes, and many other species. Birds include hornbills, common cranes, common redshanks, Eurasian woodcocks, spotted eagles, black-throated divers, little grebes, various types of herons, black ibises, Eurasian sparrowhawks, spot-bellied eagle-owls, and several others. Fish species include katli, jurraha, chenga, telliah, labeo, and mahseer. Conservation measures have been undertaken to prevent poaching, overfishing, encroachments, and many other related issues. These measures are meant to minimise human interference in the fragile core zone, to enable the creation of a database, and to carry out research on animal and plant populations for better conservation of the ecosystem.

In 1980, the park was central to the Bodoland agitation of Assam as the Bodos dominating the area took refuge in the sanctuary. Bodos have been demanding autonomy or a separate state of their own on grounds that their lands were incorporated into Assam during the British Raj.

== Environmental issues ==
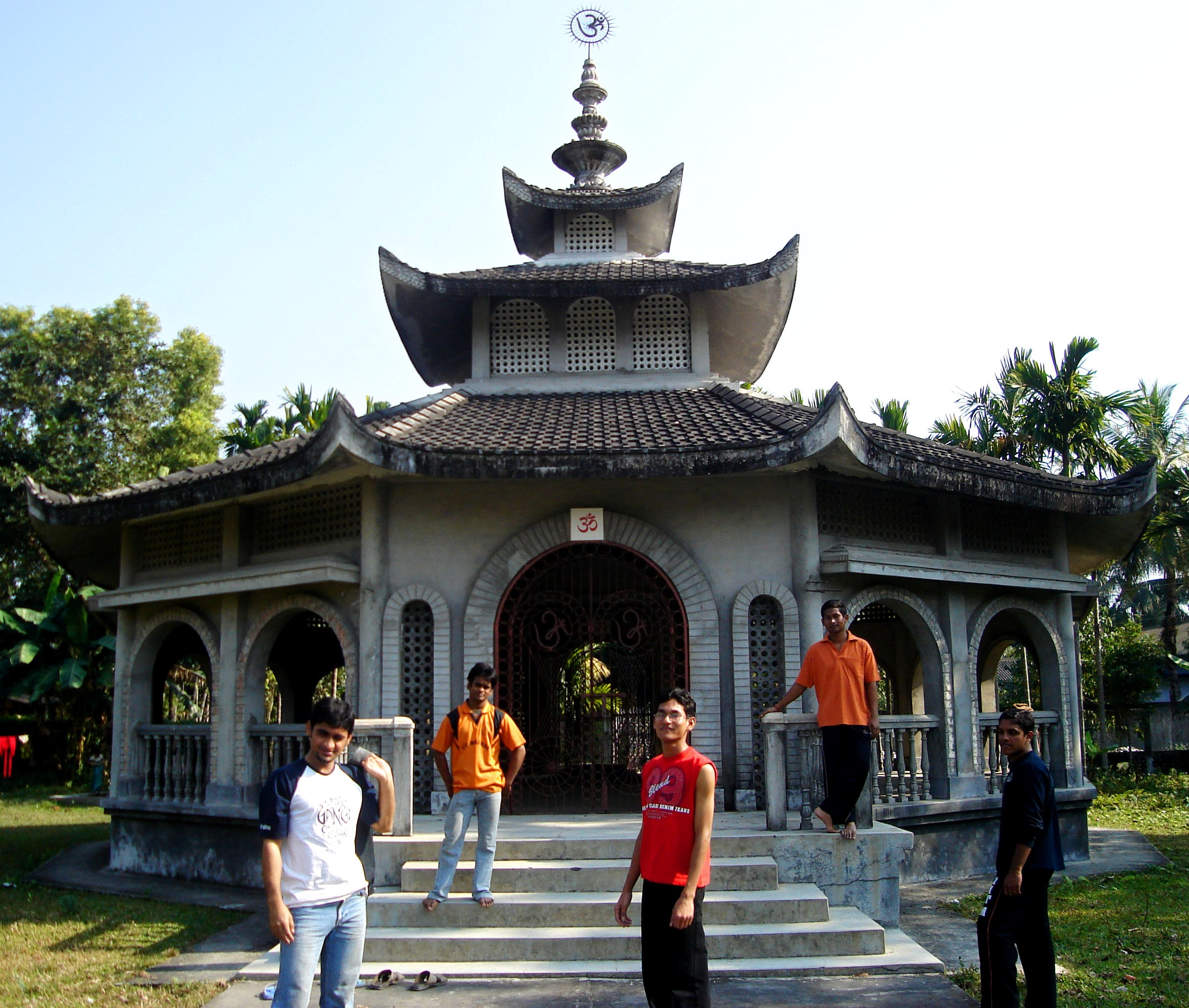
A Brahma temple in the Manas valley at Kokrajhar in Assam

The Manas River has often been at the centre of environmental controversies, particularly in the 1980s. Two dams were proposed on the Bhutanese side of the river to provide hydroelectric power and to control the flow of the Brahmaputra on its northern bank and to make way for irrigation schemes. However, there were not only local concerns but national and international ones among environmentalists with regard to the proposals, who lobbied enough support to ensure that the dam proposals were dropped in 1986. In February 1989, the All Bodo Students Union (ABSU) invaded the park and killed several wardens and guards, permitting the entry of poachers and loggers who posed an immediate threat to the wildlife of the park and its river. The threat of flooding remained as ever in 2010.

One of the development projects planned in the past on the Manas River envisaged flood control in the Brahmaputra River and augmentation of flows in the Ganga river system by building a dam on the Manas at the Indo-Bhutan border. The water stored behind the reservoir was proposed to be transferred through a long canal system through the foothills of the Himalayas (skirting Bangladesh), crossing 25 major and minor rivers, out of which the major rivers the Sankosh, Raidak, Amo (Torsa), Karatoya, Teesta, Atrai and Mahananda flow through North Bengal, and finally into the Kosi River in North Bihar. The project has not proceeded further due to adverse public opinion and environmental concerns.

A proposal mooted in the 1970s to build a dam on the river for multipurpose uses of power, irrigation, and flood control in Assam involved a 100 km (62 mi) canal from the Manas reservoir to another reservoir on the Sankosh River. As the canal would have passed through the Manas Tiger Reserve, the Ministry of Environment and Forests of the Government of India objected to the proposal on the grounds of adverse impacts on the hydrology and ecology of the area that would occur due to the dam. This view was also supported by the World Heritage Committee of UNESCO. The late Prime Minister of India Rajiv Gandhi upheld the objections and decided to discontinue the project. It is unlikely to be revived. The proposal had been mooted as a joint project of India and Bhutan. The pre-feasibility report prepared for this Manas multipurpose project envisaged power generation of 2800 MW. Another cooperation project on the Mangde Chu, a tributary of the Manas in central Bhutan, envisages power generation of 360/600 MW, for which a Detailed Project Report (DPR) is under preparation.

== See also ==
- List of rivers in Assam
- Manas National Park
