= RMNP (disambiguation) =

RMNP is the Rocky Mountain National Park in the state of Colorado, United States.

RMNP may also refer to:

- Rwenzori Mountains National Park in Uganda
- Royal Manas National Park in Bhutan
- Riding Mountain National Park in the province of Manitoba, Canada

== See also ==
- List of national parks
