= Mangde Chhu =

Coordinates: 26.838°N 90.950°E

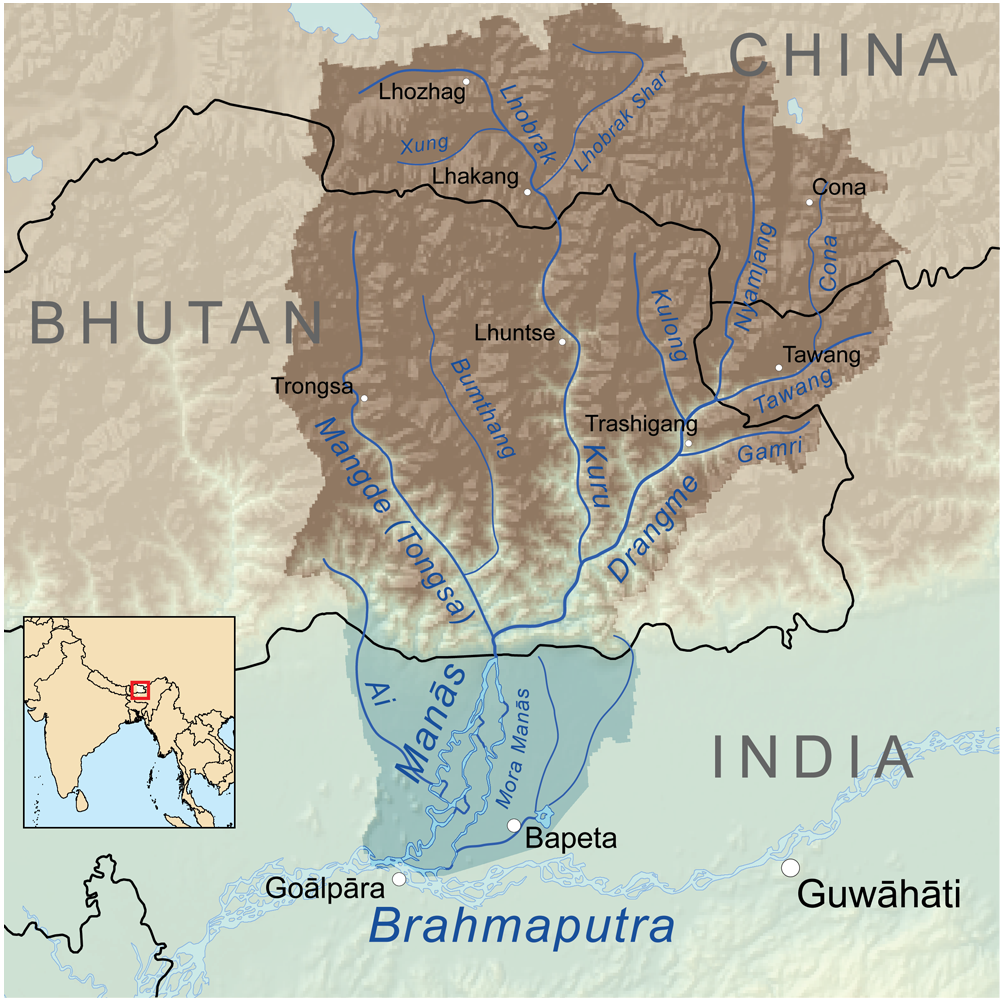
- Mangde (left)

Location
- Country: Bhutan

Basin features
- River system: Manas River, Brahmaputra River

Mangde Chhu or Tongsa river flows in central Bhutan traversing roughly north–south. The river rises in Wangdue Phodrang district (or dzongkhag in Dzongkha), near Gangkhar Puensum, Bhutan's highest peak at 7,546 metres (24,757 ft). Bhutan's main east–west highway crosses the Mangde Chhu about 8 kilometres (5 mi) west of Trongsa. South of Trongsa, the river drains the eastern slopes of the Black Mountains (Bhutan), and forms the eastern boundaries of Black Mountain National Park and Royal Manas National Park. Another highway follows the river south from Trongsa to Shemgang. The highway leaves the river at Tingtinbi, and eventually reaches the Indian border at Gelegphug. South of Tingtinbi, the Mangde is joined by the Bumthang River from the east, and is known as the Tongasa. Shortly before entering India in Assam, the Manas River flows into the river from the east, and the river exits Bhutan near Manas.

Important towns and areas through which the Trongsa - Gelegphug road passes are Shemgang (Shamgong), Taama, Bataase, and Surey rice fields. The road and bridges were built by the Indian Border Roads Organisation. Among the number of bridges built across this river, two are noteworthy. They are the Bailey suspension bridges of about 110-metre (360 ft) span, one near Hathisar and the other at Tama built between 1963 and 1965.
