= Udanti Wildlife Sanctuary =

- IUCN category IV (habitat/species management area)
- Location within Chhattisgarh Location within India
- Interactive map of Udanti Wildlife Sanctuary
- Location: Gariaband district, Chhattisgarh, India
- Nearest city: Raipur
- Coordinates: 20.12°N 82.37°E
- Area: 237.27 km^{2} (91.61 sq mi)
- Established: 1983

Udanti Wildlife Sanctuary is a protected area and wildlife sanctuary located in Gariaband district of the Indian state of Chhattisgarh.

== Geography ==
Udanti Wildlife Sanctuary covers an area of 237.27 km^{2} (91.61 sq mi) and was declared as a protected area in 1983. It forms part of the Udanti Sitanadi tiger reserve along with the Sitanadi Wildlife Sanctuary.

== Flora and fauna ==
The protected area consists of a mixture of moist and dry tropical deciduous forests. Udanti was created for the protection of the endangered wild water buffalo, the flagship species of the sanctuary. Other notable animals include Bengal tiger, Indian leopard, sloth bear, Indian jackal, dhole, striped hyena, jungle cat, gaur, chital, sambar deer, and nilgai. Avifauna include pintails, rollers, and herons. The park consists of reptiles such as monitor lizards and pythons.
