= Bumthang River =

River in Bhutan

Coordinates: 27.0187°N 90.8404°E

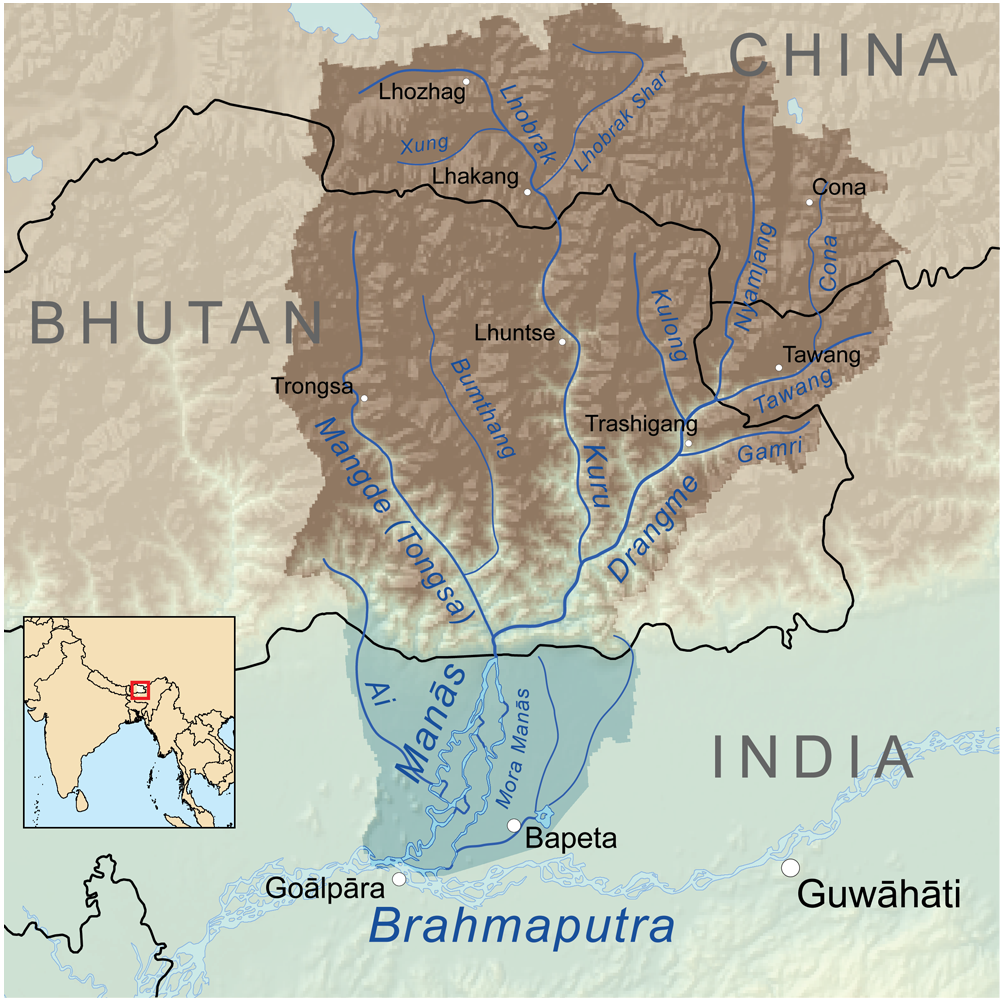

Bumthang River (also known as Murchangphy Chhu) is a river in Bhutan. It joins the Tongsa Chhu or Mangde Chhu in southern Bhutan and the combined stream flows into the Manas River.

== See also ==
- Bumthang District
