= Royal Manas National Park =

National Park of Bhutan

- IUCN category II (national park)
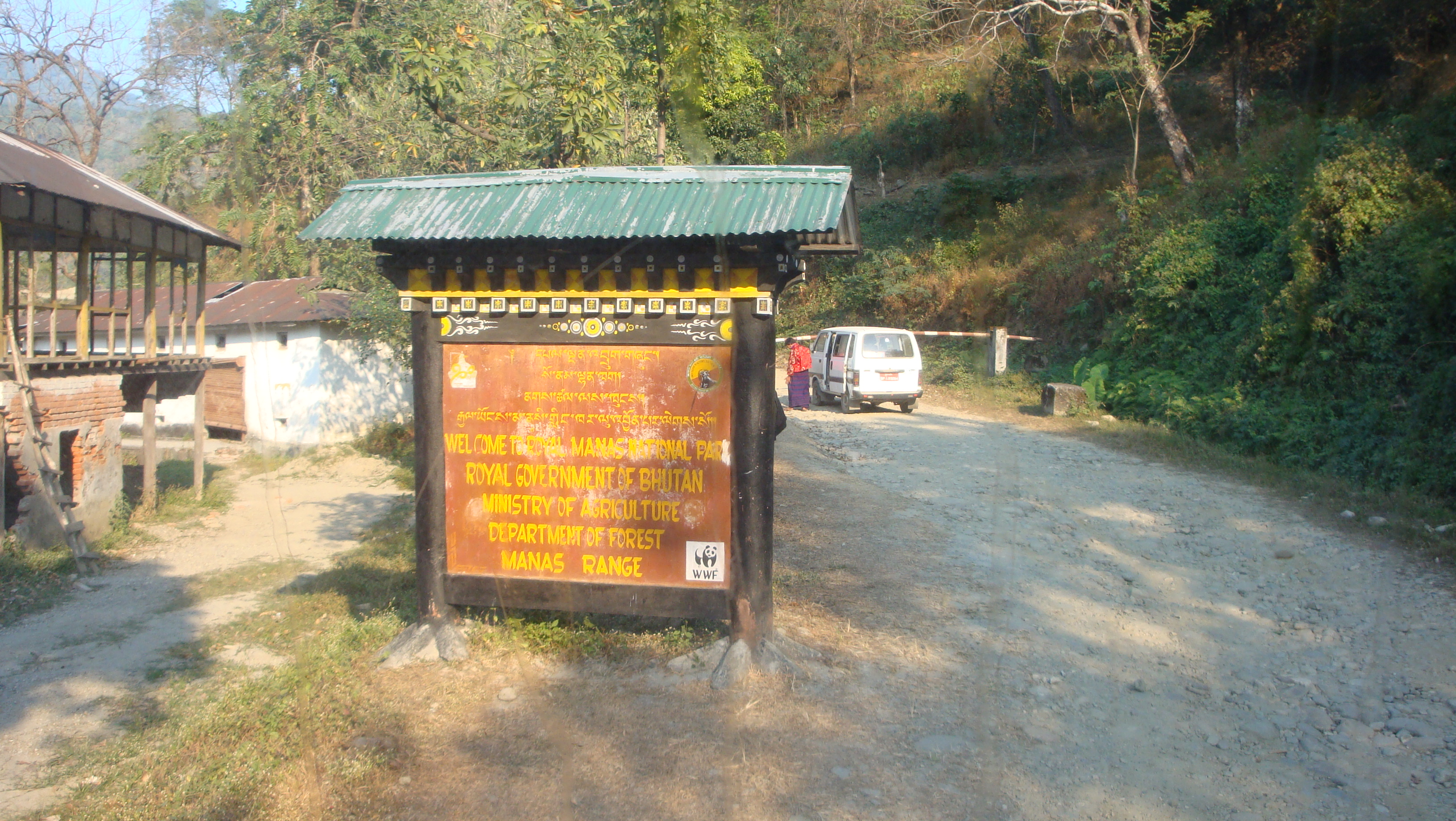
- Entrance to the park

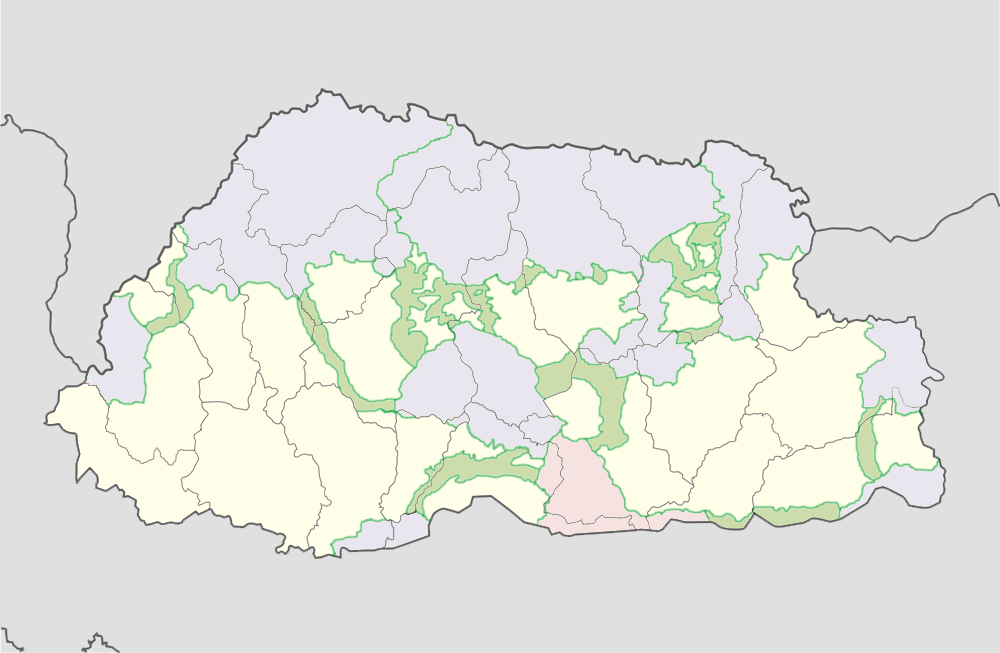
- Location of Royal Manas National Park in pink
- Location: Pemagatshel, Sarpang, Zhemgang, Bhutan
- Area: 1,057 km^{2} (408 sq mi)
- Established: 1966
- Governing body: Department of Forests and Park Services of Bhutan
- Website: Department of Forests and Park services

Royal Manas National Park is Bhutan's oldest national park, and the Royal government considers it the "conservation showpiece of the Kingdom" and a "genetic depository" for valuable plants. It has an area of 1,057 square kilometres (408 sq mi) and covers eastern Sarpang District, the western half of Zhemgang District, and western Pemagatshel District.

It is connected via "biological corridors" to Phibsoo Wildlife Sanctuary, Jigme Singye Wangchuck National Park, Phrumsengla National Park, and Jomotsangkha Wildlife Sanctuary. Royal Manas also directly abuts the World Heritage Site Manas National Park in Assam, India, to the south. It is listed as a tentative site in Bhutan's Tentative List for UNESCO inclusion.

Entry is prohibited to the public.

== History ==
Royal Manas was one of the earliest focuses of the Bhutan Trust Fund in the early 1990s, receiving infrastructure development and baseline biological and socio-economic assessments. Bhutan's first park management plan was prepared for Royal Manas, and guided management of other parks.

== Natural history ==
=== Flora ===
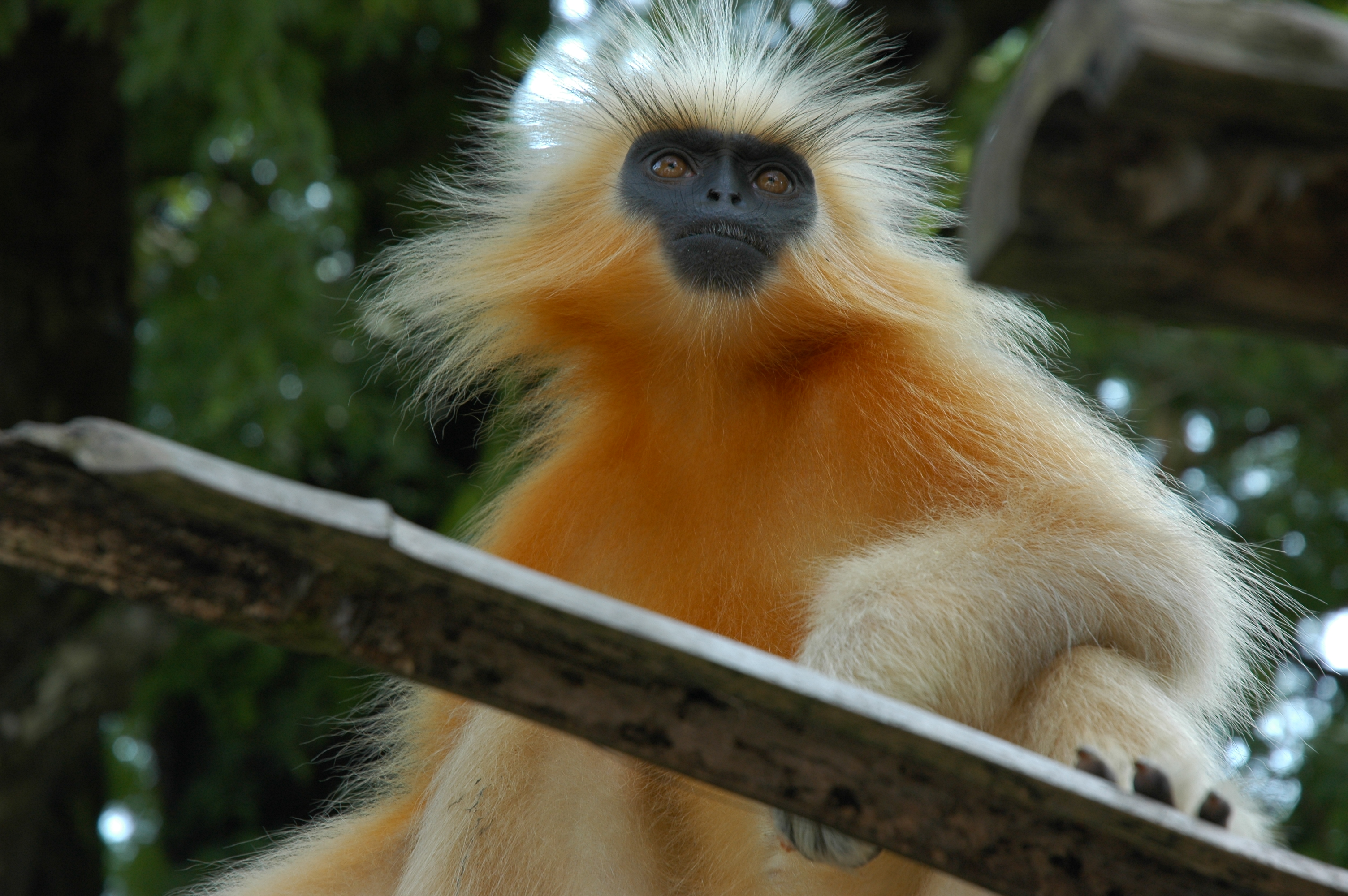
Golden langur (Presbytis geei)

Habitats in Royal Manas National Park range from lowland tropical forests to permanent ice fields. Ecoregions in the park include Eastern Himalayan broadleaf forests and Himalayan subtropical pine forests.

Royal Manas also produces several plant species used in food, commerce, medicine, and religious rituals. About 5,000 people live in remote, isolated villages within the park.

=== Fauna ===
Royal Manas National Park is home to Bengal tigers, elephants, gaur (Bos gaurus), as well as rarer golden langur (Presbytis geei), pygmy hog (Sus salvanius), hispid hare (Caprolagus hispidus), and Ganges river dolphin (Platanista). It is also the only Bhutanese park inhabited by the one-horned rhinoceros (Rhinoceros unicornis) and wild water buffalo (Bubalus arnee). Hundreds of species of birds—including four species of hornbills: rufous-necked, wreathed, pied and great Indian—also live in the vast park.

The Manas River and its tributaries are home to three species of rare migratory game fish called mahseer: the deep-bodied mahseer (Tor tor), golden mahseer (Tor putitora), and chocolate mahseer or Katle (Acrossocheilus hexangonolepis).

== See also ==
- List of the national parks of Bhutan
- List of protected areas of Bhutan
- Manas National Park — adjacent in Assam, India.
