= Pied hornbill =

Pied hornbill may refer to:

- The Malabar pied hornbill
- The Oriental pied hornbill
- The African pied hornbill
- The great hornbill, also known as the great pied hornbill
