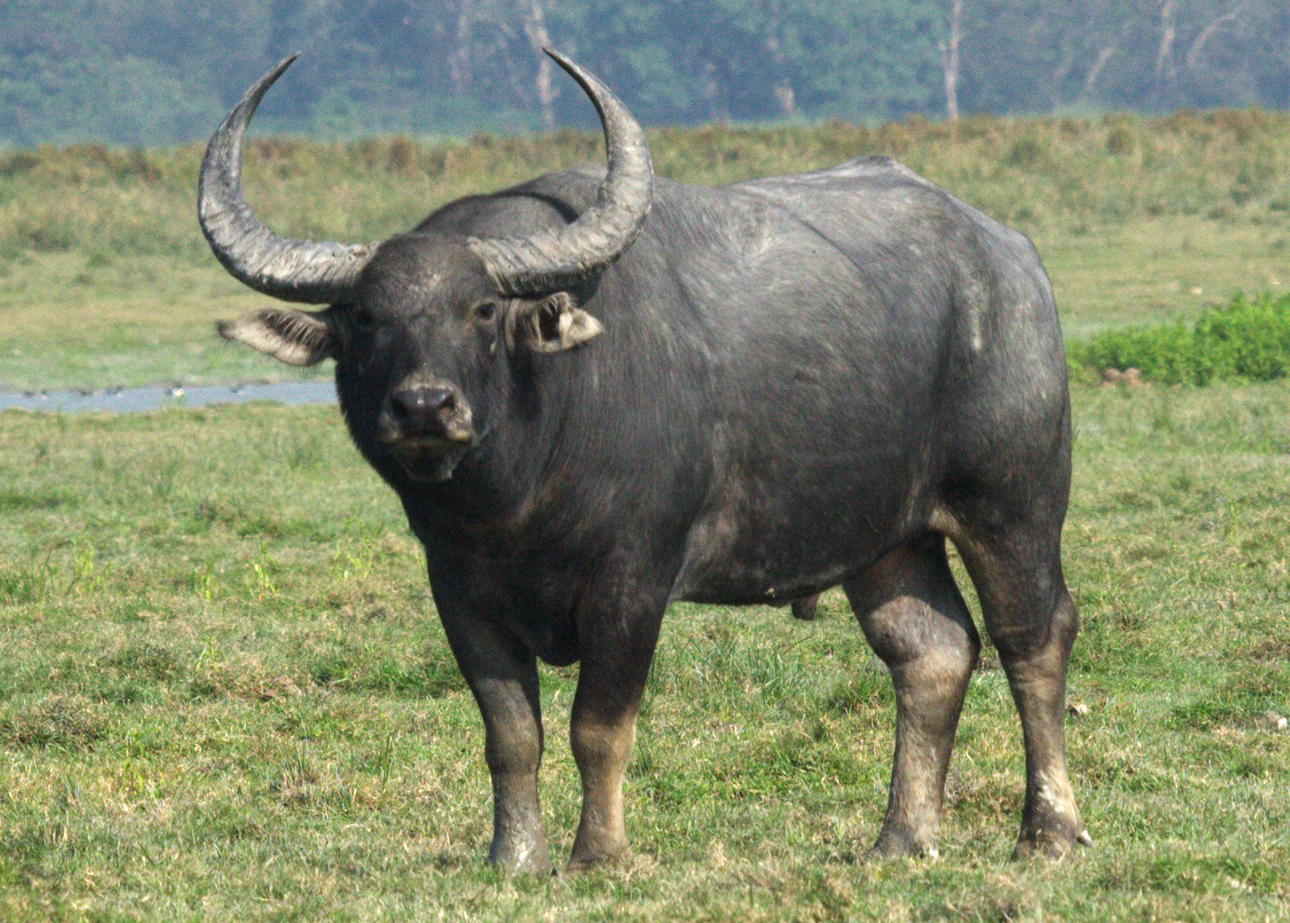
- in Kaziranga National Park

Conservation status
- Endangered (IUCN 3.1)
- CITES Appendix III

Scientific classification
- Kingdom: Animalia
- Phylum: Chordata
- Class: Mammalia
- Order: Artiodactyla
- Family: Bovidae
- Subfamily: Bovinae
- Genus: Bubalus
- Species: B. arnee

Binomial name
- Bubalus arnee (Kerr, 1792)

Subspecies
- B. a. arnee; B. a. fulvus; B. a. septentrionalis; B. a. migona
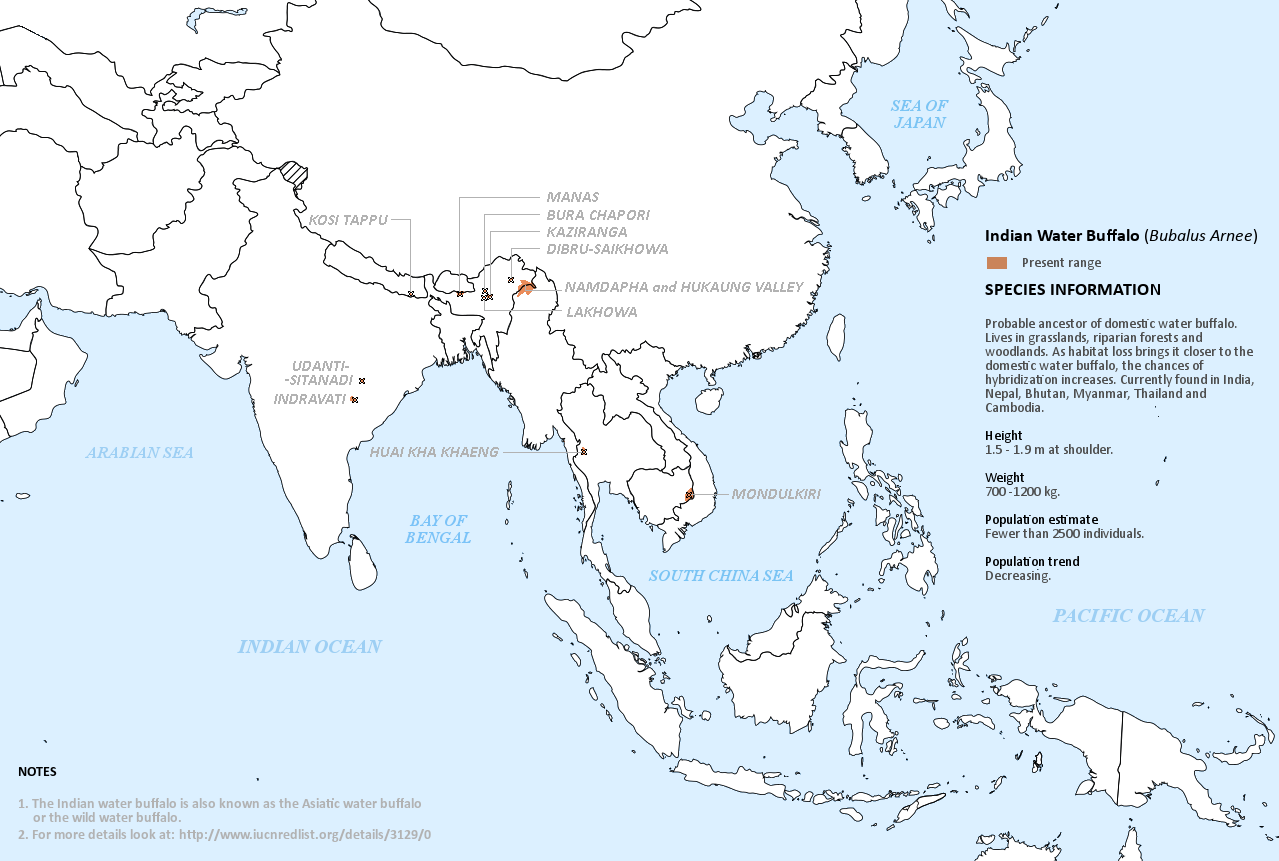
- Wild water buffalo range

= Wild water buffalo =

Wild water buffalo Temporal range: Middle Pleistocene-Present

Species of mammal

The wild water buffalo (Bubalus arnee), also called Asian buffalo, Asiatic buffalo and wild buffalo, is a large bovine native to the Indian subcontinent and Southeast Asia. It was first described in 1792.

The wild water buffalo is the most likely ancestor of the domestic water buffalo. It has been listed as endangered on the IUCN Red List since 1986, as the global population totals less than 4,000 mature individuals.

== Taxonomy ==
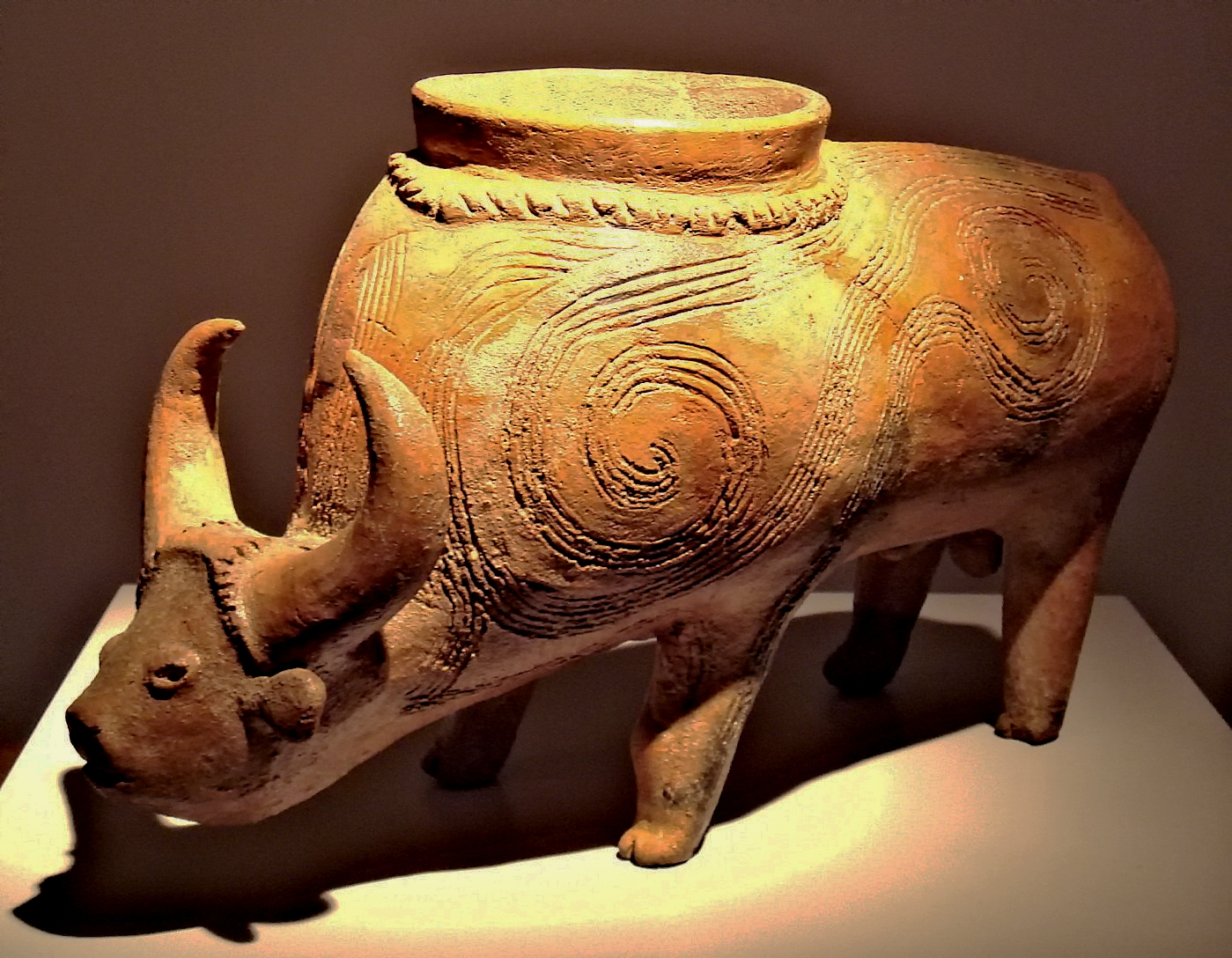
Water buffalo sculpture, Lopburi, Thailand, 2300 BCE

Bos arnee was the scientific name proposed by Robert Kerr in 1792 who described a skull with horns of a buffalo zoological specimen from Bengal in northern India. Bubalus arnee was proposed by Charles Hamilton Smith in 1827 who introduced the generic name Bubalus for bovids with large heads, convex-shaped narrow foreheads, laterally bent flat horns, funnel-shaped ears, small dewlaps and slender tails. Later authors subordinated the wild water buffalo under either Bos, Bubalus or Buffelus.

In 2003, the International Commission on Zoological Nomenclature placed Bubalus arnee on the Official List of Specific Names in Zoology, recognizing the validity of this name for a wild species. Most authors have adopted the binomen Bubalus arnee for the wild water buffalo as valid for the taxon.

The wild water buffalo is the most likely ancestor of the domestic water buffalo.

Only a few DNA sequences are available from wild water buffalo populations. Wild populations are considered to be the progenitor of the modern domestic water buffalo, but the genetic variation within the species is unclear, and also how it is related to the domesticated river and Carabao swamp buffaloes.

== Etymology ==
The specific name arnee is reminiscent of the classical Sanskrit word arnī meaning female wild buffalo.

== Characteristics ==
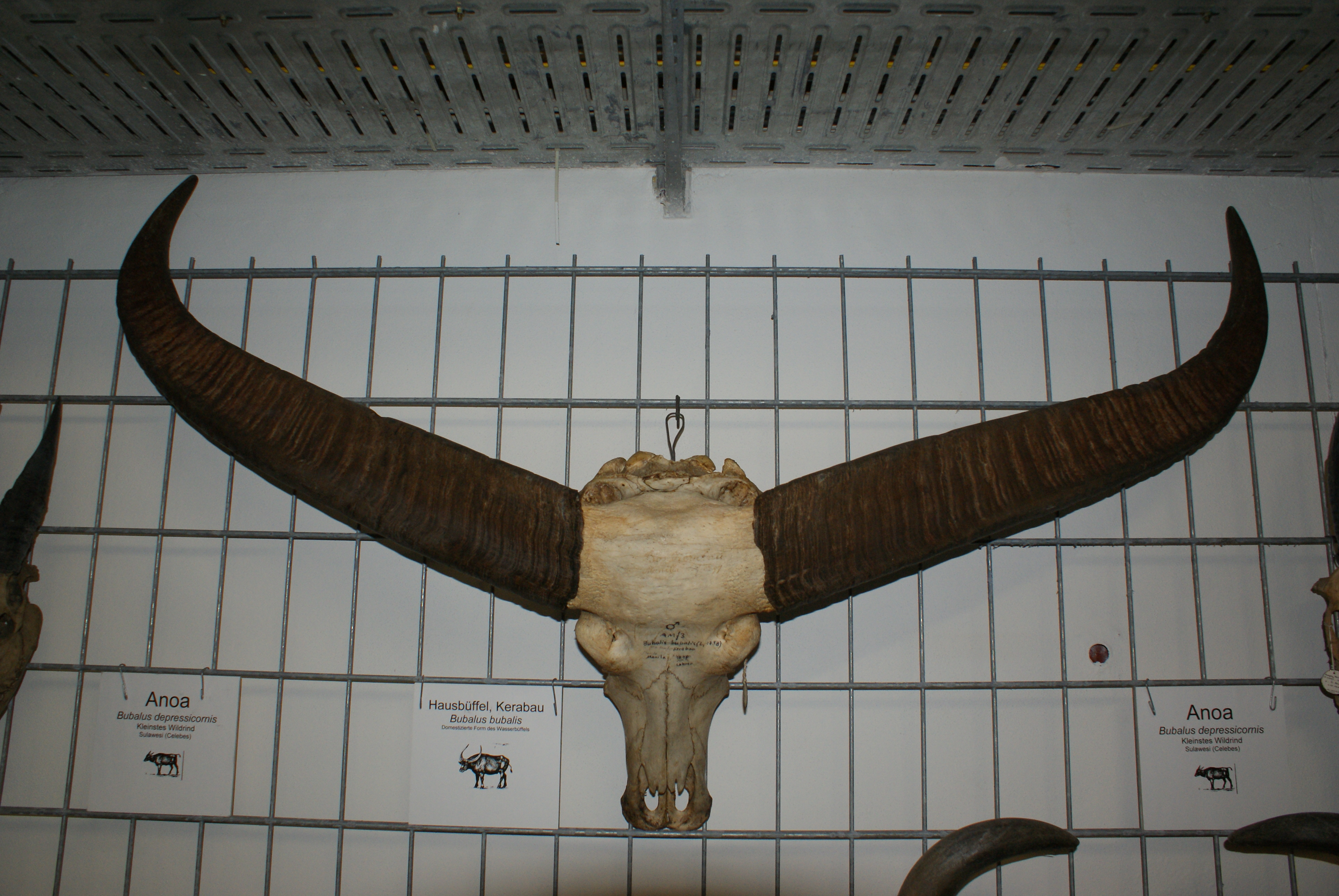
Skull of a wild water buffalo in the Bavarian State Collection of Zoology

The wild water buffalo has an ash-gray to black skin. The moderately long, coarse and sparse hair is directed forward from the haunches to the long and narrow head. There is a tuft on the forehead, and the ears are comparatively small. Its head-to-body-length is 240 to 300 cm (94 to 118 in) with a 60 to 100 cm (24 to 39 in) long tail and a shoulder height of 150 to 190 cm (59 to 75 in). Both sexes carry horns that are heavy at the base and widely spreading up to 2 m (6 ft 7 in) along the outer edges, exceeding in size the horns of any other living bovid. The tip of the tail is bushy; the hooves are large and splayed. It is larger and heavier than the domestic water buffalo, and weighs from 600 to 1,200 kg (1,300 to 2,600 lb). The average weight of three captive wild water buffaloes was 900 kg (2,000 lb). It is among the heaviest living wild bovid species, and is slightly smaller than gaur.

== Distribution and habitat ==
The wild water buffalo occurs in India, Nepal, Bhutan, Thailand, and Cambodia, with an unconfirmed population in Myanmar. It has been extirpated in Bangladesh, Laos, Vietnam and Sri Lanka. It inhabits wet grasslands, swamps, flood plains and densely vegetated river valleys.

In India, it is largely restricted to in and around Kaziranga, Manas and Dibru-Saikhowa National Parks, Laokhowa Wildlife Sanctuary and Bura Chapori Wildlife Sanctuary and in a few scattered pockets in Assam, and in and around D'Ering Memorial Wildlife Sanctuary in Arunachal Pradesh. A small population survives in Balphakram National Park in Meghalaya, and in Chhattisgarh in Indravati National Park and Udanti Wildlife Sanctuary. This population might extend into adjacent parts of Odisha. In the early 1990s, there may still have been about 3,300–3,500 wild water buffaloes in Assam and the adjacent states of northeast India. In 1997, the number was assessed at less than 1,500 mature individuals.

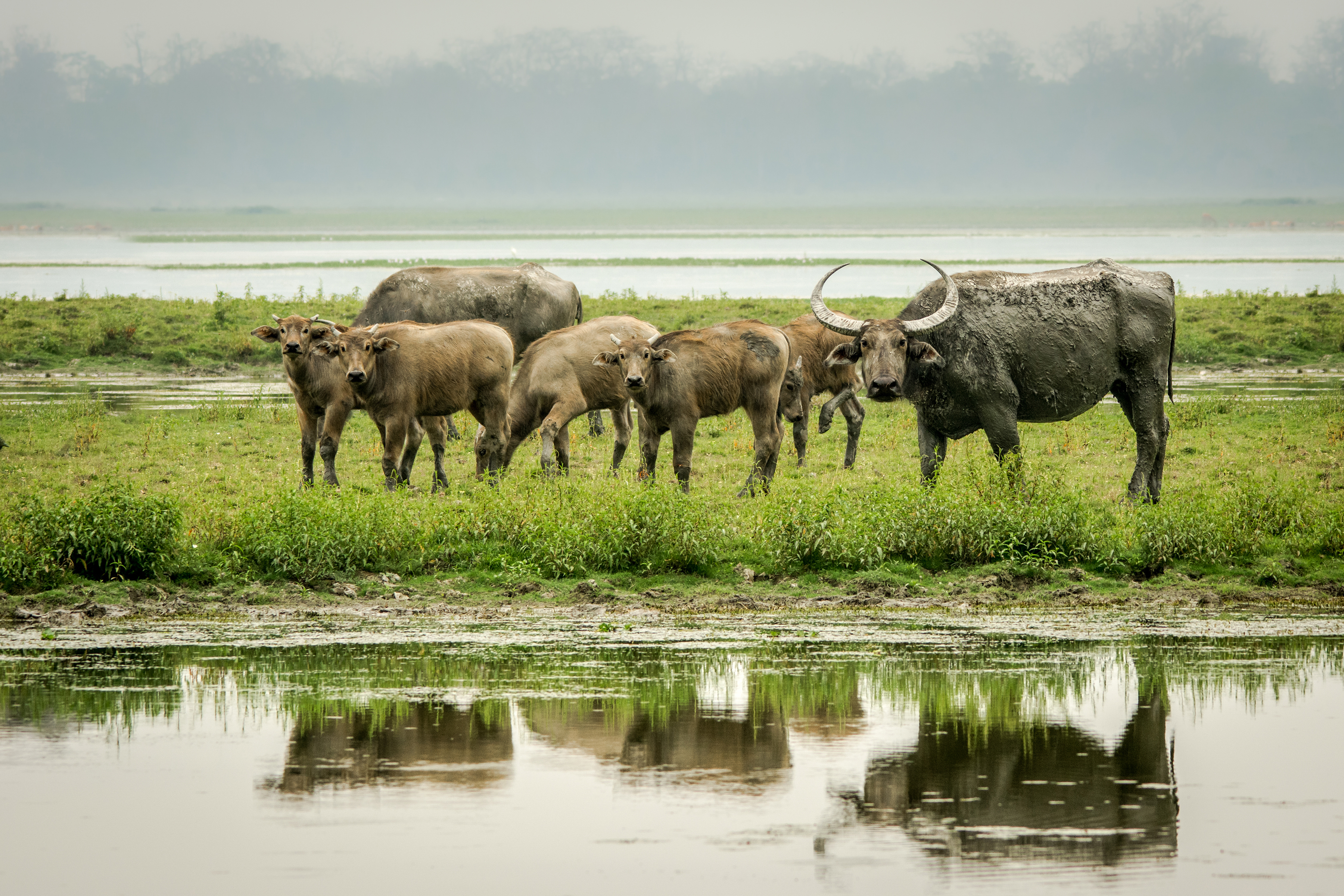
A herd of wild water buffaloes in Kaziranga National Park, Assam

Many surviving populations are thought to have interbred with feral or domestic water buffaloes. In the late 1980s, fewer than 100 wild water buffaloes were left in Madhya Pradesh. By 1992, only 50 animals were estimated to have survived there.

Nepal's only population lives in Koshi Tappu Wildlife Reserve and has grown from 63 individuals in 1976 to 219 individuals in 2009. In 2016, 18 individuals were translocated from Koshi Tappu Wildlife Reserve to Chitwan National Park.

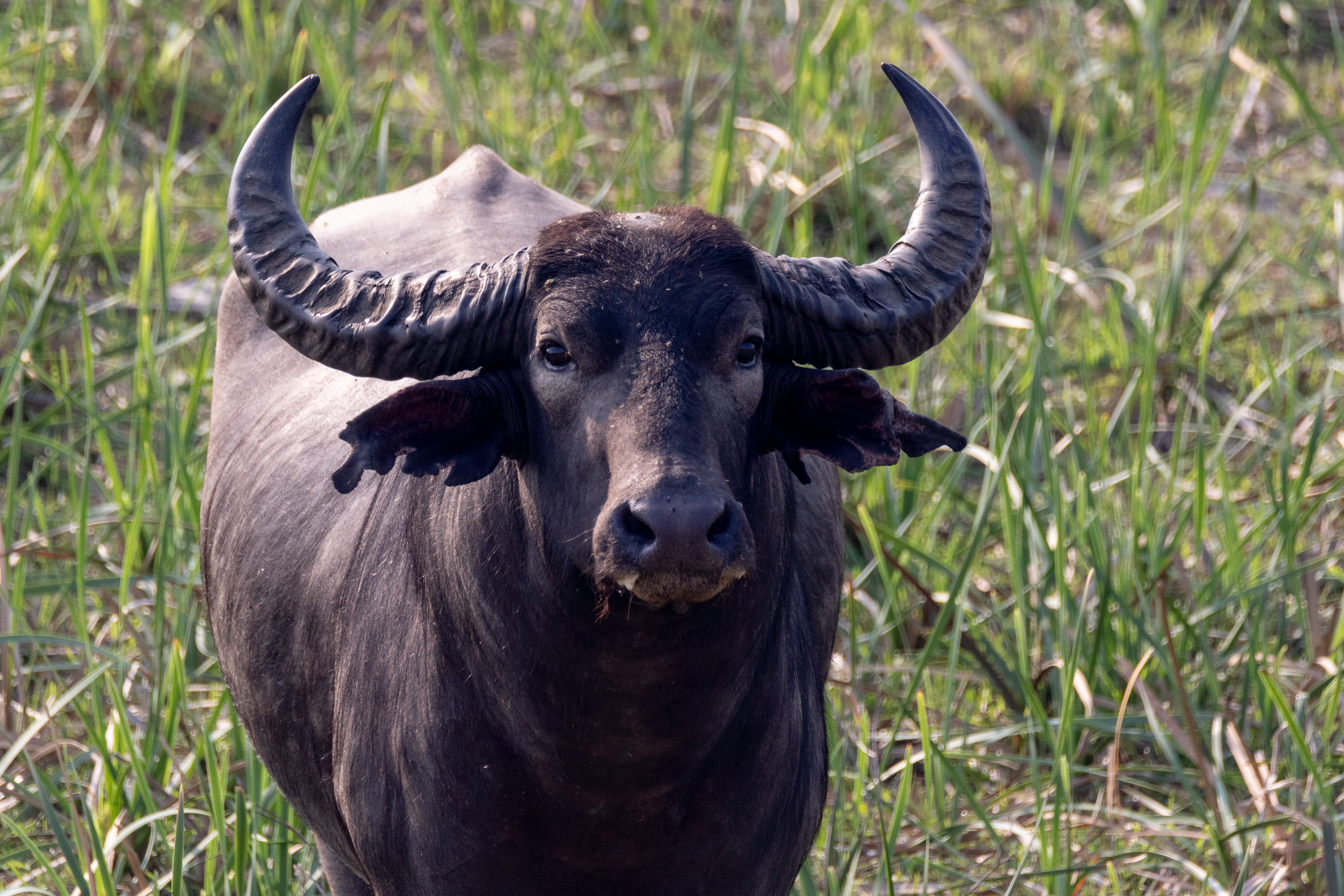
Wild water buffalo at Koshi Tappu Wildlife Reserve, Nepal

In and around Bhutan's Royal Manas National Park, a small number of wild water buffaloes occur. This is part of the sub-population that occurs in India's Manas National Park. In Myanmar, a few animals live in Hukaung Valley Wildlife Sanctuary.

In Thailand, wild water buffaloes have been reported to occur in small herds of less than 40 individuals. A population of 25–60 individuals inhabited lowland areas of the Huai Kha Khaeng Wildlife Sanctuary between December 1999 and April 2001. This population has not grown significantly in 15 years, and is maybe interbreeding with domestic water buffaloes.

The population in Cambodia is confined to a small area of easternmost Mondulkiri and possibly Ratanakiri Provinces. Only a few dozen individuals remained as of 2005.

The wild water buffaloes in Sri Lanka are thought to be descendants of the introduced domestic water buffalo. It is unlikely that any true wild water buffaloes remain there today. Results of a 2023 study using craniometric and genetic analysis indicate that the wild and domestic water buffalos occur in Sri Lanka alongside each other and likely hybridized; and that the wild water buffalo is likely a unique subspecies endemic to Sir Lanka, B. a. migona.

Wild-living populations found elsewhere in Asia, Australia, Argentina and Bolivia are feral domestic water buffaloes.

== Ecology and behaviour ==
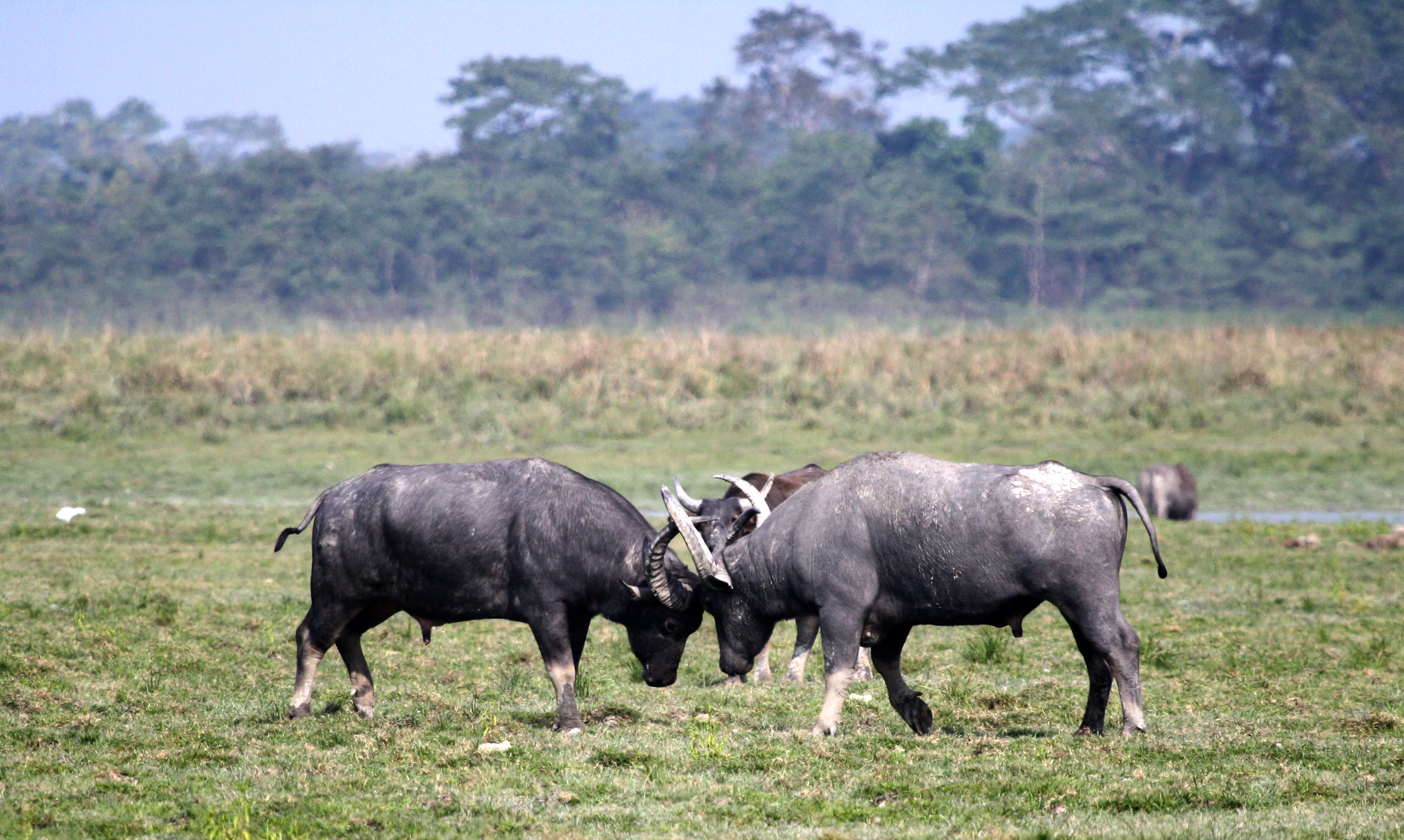
Water buffalo fighting

The wild water buffalo is both diurnal and nocturnal. Adult females and their young form stable clans of as many as 30 individuals, which have home ranges of 170 to 1,000 ha (420 to 2,470 acres) that include areas for resting, grazing, wallowing and drinking. Clans are led by old cows, even when bulls accompany the group. Several clans form a herd of 30 to 500 animals that gather at resting areas. Adult males form bachelor groups of up to 10 individuals, with older males often being solitary, and spend the dry season apart from the female clans. They are seasonal breeders in most of their range, typically in October and November. However, some populations breed year round. Dominant males mate with the females of a clan who subsequently drive them off. Their gestation period is 10 to 11 months, with an inter-birth interval of one year. They typically give birth to a single offspring, although twins are possible. Age at sexual maturity is 18 months for males, and three years for females. The maximum known lifespan is 25 years in the wild. In Assam, herd sizes vary from three to 30 individuals.

The wild water buffalo is probably a grazer by preference, feeding mainly on graminoids when available, such as Bermuda grass, and Cyperus sedges, but it also eats other herbs, fruits, and bark, and browses on trees and shrubs. It also feeds on crops, including rice, sugarcane, and jute, sometimes causing considerable damage. During the Pleistocene, its diet was far more varied; it foraged in C_{3}-dominant forests and woodlands and in C_{4}-dominant grasslands, while today it is restricted to the latter type of environment.

Tigers and mugger crocodiles prey on adult wild water buffaloes, and Asian black bears have also been known to kill them.

== Threats ==
A population reduction by at least 50% over the last three generations seems likely given the severity of the threats, especially hybridization; this population trend is projected to continue into the future. The most important threats are:

- interbreeding with feral and domestic water buffaloes in and around protected areas;
- hunting, especially in Thailand, Cambodia, and Myanmar;
- habitat loss of floodplain areas due to conversion to agriculture and hydropower development;
- degradation of wetlands due to invasive species such as stem twiners and lianas;
- diseases and parasites transmitted by domestic livestock;
- interspecific competition for food and water between wild water buffaloes and livestock.

== Conservation ==
Bubalus arnee is included in CITES Appendix III, and is legally protected in Bhutan, India, Nepal, and Thailand.

In 2017, 15 wild water buffaloes were reintroduced into Chitwan National Park in Nepal to establish a second viable sub-population in the country.

In 2023, four wild buffalos were translocated to Udanti-Sitanadi Tiger Reserve to reverse its declining population in the state.
