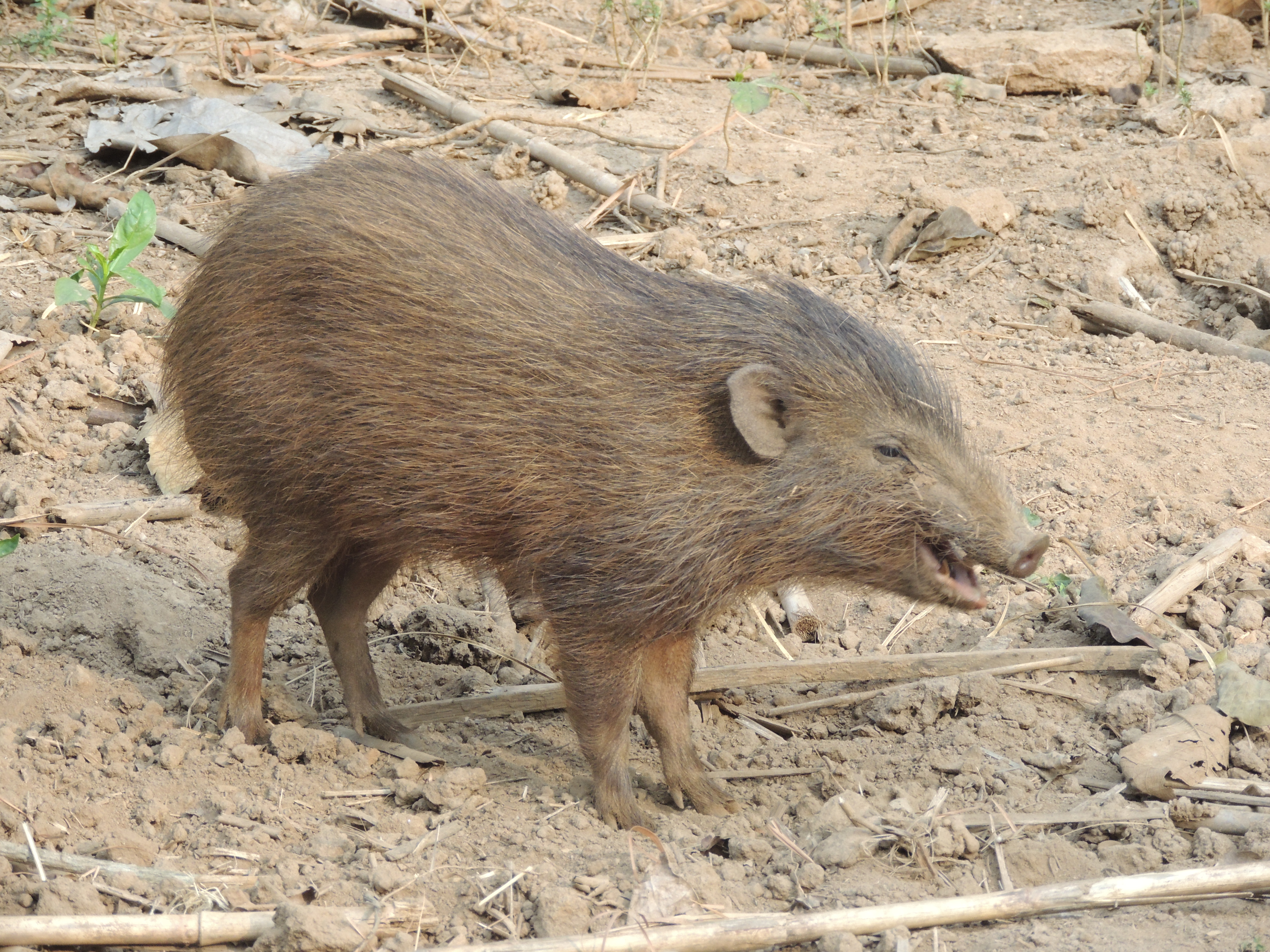
- At the Pygmy Hog Research and Breeding Centre, Assam

Conservation status
- Endangered (IUCN 3.1)
- CITES Appendix I

Scientific classification
- Kingdom: Animalia
- Phylum: Chordata
- Class: Mammalia
- Order: Artiodactyla
- Family: Suidae
- Subfamily: Suinae
- Genus: Porcula; Hodgson, 1847
- Species: P. salvania

Binomial name
- Porcula salvania Hodgson, 1847
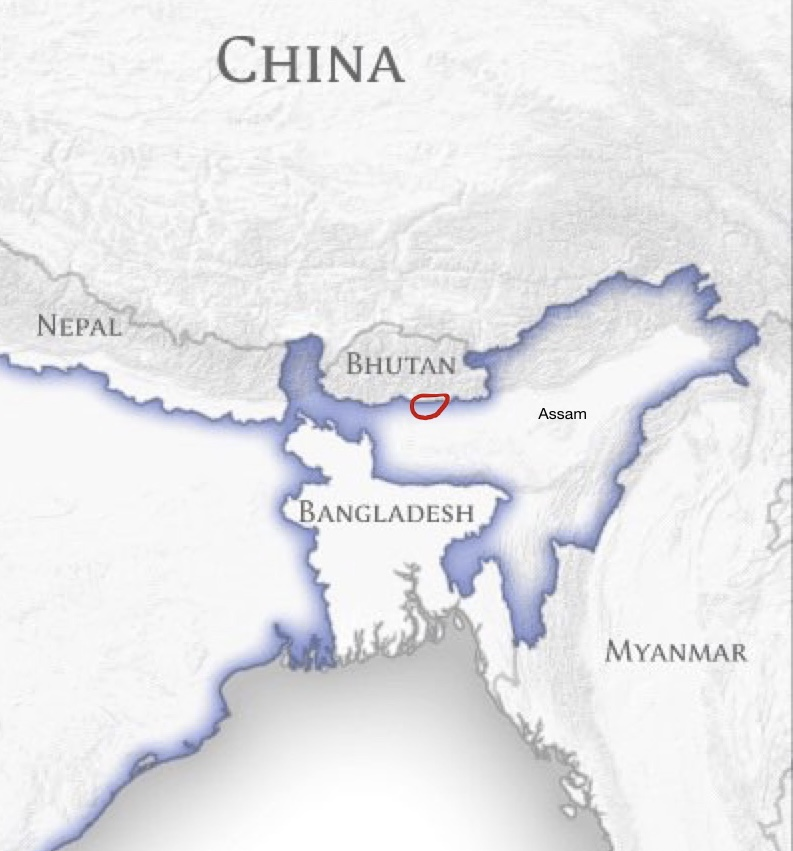
- Distribution of the pygmy hog

Synonyms
- Sus salvanius

= Pygmy hog =

Species of mammal

The pygmy hog (Porcula salvania) is a very small and endangered species of pig and the only species in the genus Porcula. Endemic to India, the pygmy hog is a suid native of the alluvial grasslands in the foothills of the Himalayas, at elevations of up to 300 m (980 ft). Populations of pygmy hogs were once widespread in the tall, dense, wet grasslands in a narrow belt of the southern Himalayan foothills from north-western Uttar Pradesh to Assam, through southern Nepal and North Bengal, and possibly extending into contiguous habitats in southern Bhutan. Due to human encroachment and destruction of the pygmy hogs' natural habitat, the species was thought to have gone extinct in the early 1960s. However, in 1971, a small pygmy hog population was rediscovered as they were fleeing a fire near the Barnadi Wildlife Sanctuary in Assam. Today, the only known population of pygmy hogs resides in Manas National Park. The population is threatened by livestock grazing, fires and poaching. With an estimated population of around 500 mature individuals, the pygmy hog is listed as a Endangered species on the IUCN Red List, and conservation efforts such as captive breeding and re-release programs are currently being employed.

== Taxonomy ==
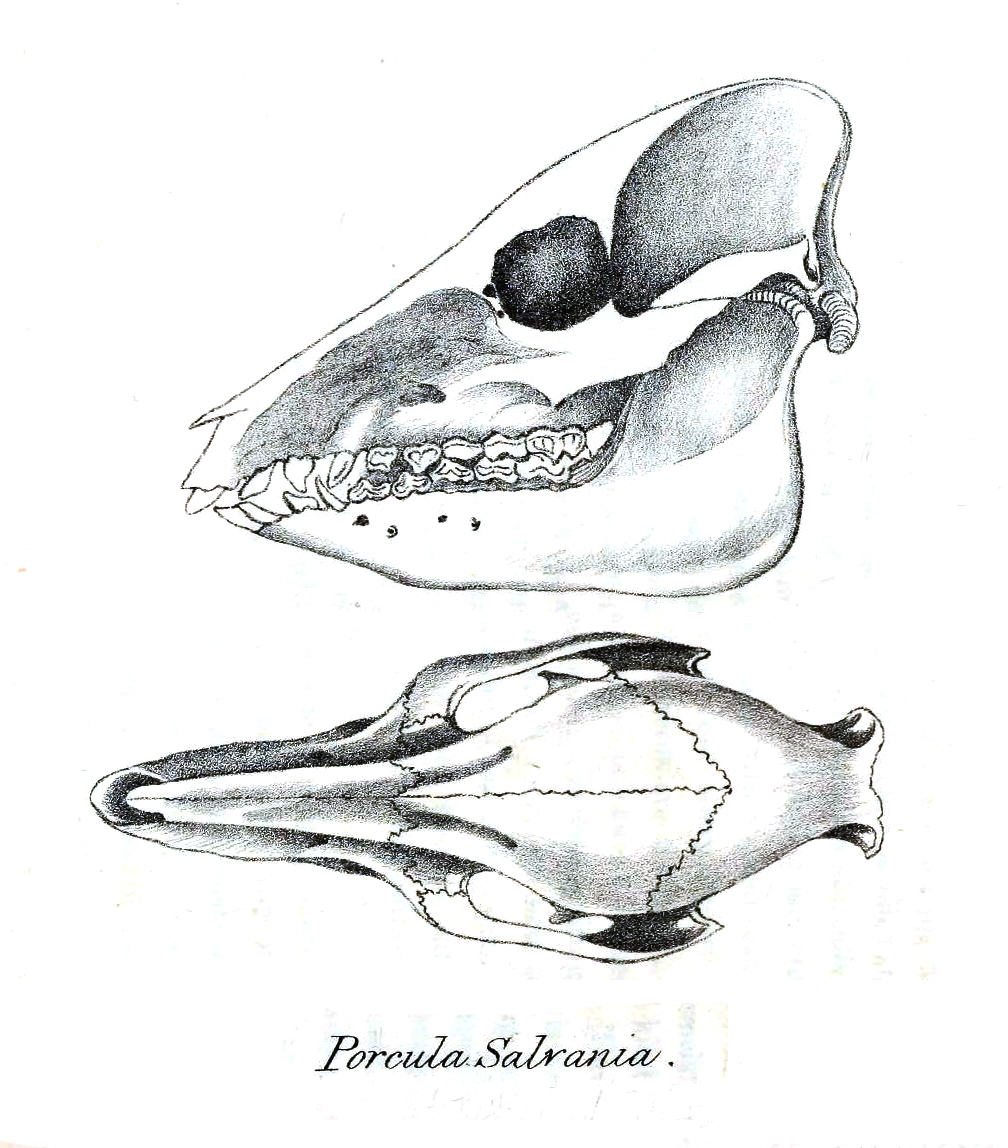
Skull of the pygmy hog

Porcula salvania was the scientific name proposed by Brian Houghton Hodgson in 1847 who described a pygmy hog from the Sikkim Terai. Hodgson argued that the pygmy hog was a genus separate from Sus based upon its unique morphological differences, particularly pertaining to its skull and dental features. Hodgson's classification of the pygmy hog as a separate genus was challenged with the argument that the pygmy hog's unique physical characteristics were "superficial" and merely a result of its small body size, therefore deeming these features insufficient to warrant separate distinction from other members of the genus Sus. Its species epithet salvania is after the sal forests where the pygmy hog was found. Although the decision was not unanimous, the pygmy hog was later determined to be a member of the genus Sus and was renamed Sus salvanius.

A 2007 genetic analysis of the variation in three mitochondrial DNA loci, combined with rigorous statistical testing of other phylogenetic hypotheses, confirmed Hodgson's original classification that the pygmy hog is a separate and distinct genus from Sus. The analysis also showed that the pygmy hog had never clustered with the wild boar or any other Sus species. Based upon this genetic analysis and resulting evidence, the pygmy hog has again been re-classified as its own unique genus Porcula, which is a sister lineage of Sus. Genome analyses support the independence of Porcula.

== Characteristics ==
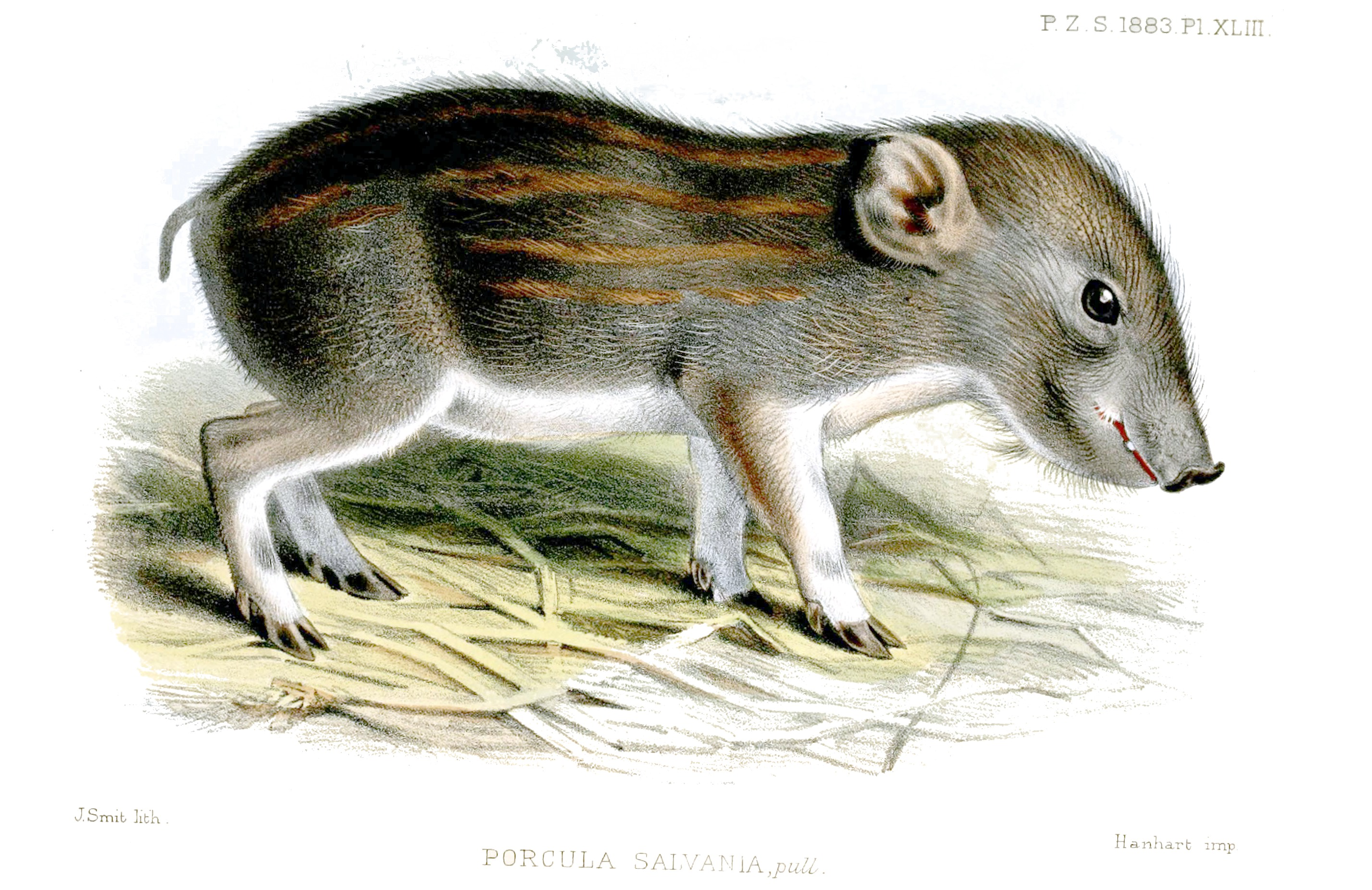
Painting of a piglet born in the London Zoological Gardens in 1883

The skin of the pygmy hog is a grayish-brown color, and its coat consists of blackish-brown bristles. Its irises are hazel brown, and it usually has no facial warts. Its head is sharply tapered with a slight crest of hair on the forehead and on the back of the neck. It has well-developed teeth, with upturned canines and molars with rounded cusps. Adult males have the upper canines visible on the sides of their mouths.

As suggested by its name, the pygmy hog differs from other members of the Suidae by the extreme reduction of its body size, and it is the smallest pig species. An adult pygmy hog weighs between 6.6 and 9.7 kg (15 and 21 lb), with the average male weighing about 8.5 kg (19 lb). From its hoof to its shoulder, the pygmy hog ranges from about 20–25 cm (7.9–9.8 in) tall and is about 55–71 cm (22–28 in) long. Females are only slightly smaller than males, and both sexes have tails approximately 2.5 cm (0.98 in) long.

== Distribution and habitat ==
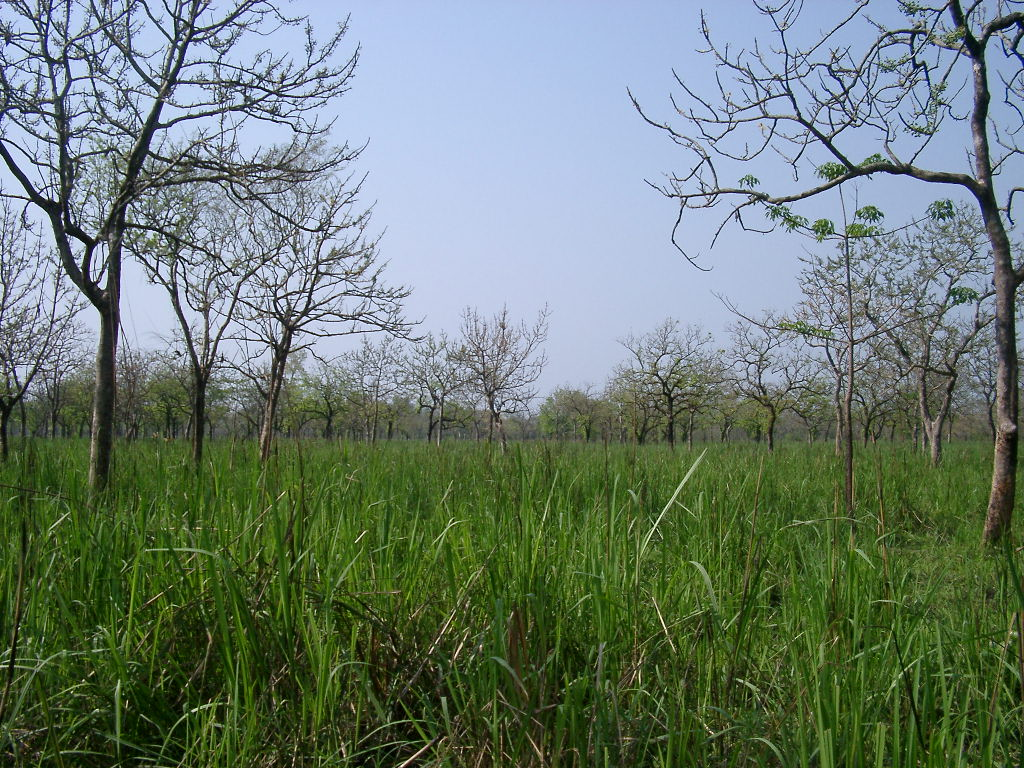
Grassland in Manas Wildlife Sanctuary

The pygmy hog is endemic to northeast India and was once widespread in the tall, wet grasslands of the Terai from Uttar Pradesh through Nepal to Bangladesh, northern West Bengal and Assam. It inhabited early successional riverine grasslands dominated by Imperata cylindrica, Saccharum munja, S. spontaneum, S. bengalenis, Themeda villosa and Narenga porphyrocoma. In its most pristine state, these grasslands were intermixed with a wide variety of herbaceous plants and early colonizing shrubs and young trees. Growing up to 1–4 m (3 ft 3 in – 13 ft 1 in) in height, these grass species were maintained by periodic burning, which posed a great threat to the pygmy hog. Since these grass species were also commercially important thatching grasses, they were harvested annually, thereby also causing great disruption to the pygmy hog habitat.

The pygmy hog is currently on the verge of extinction. By 2002, the only viable population, consisting of only a few hundred individuals, lived in small grassland pockets of Manas National Park in Assam and in an adjacent reserve forest in the Manas Tiger Reserve. In 2013, it was estimated that only about 250 pygmy hogs existed.

== Behavior and ecology ==
Pygmy hogs are social animals that live in small family groups consisting of one or two females and their offspring. They are non-territorial, and sometimes family groups can consist of as many as 20 individuals. Adult males are generally solitary and live separately rather than with the family group. However, they do maintain loose contact with the basic family group throughout the year.

Pygmy hogs also have a unique nesting behavior which the tall grasses of their habitat enable them to perform. In the wild, they make firm nests in which to sleep by digging small trenches, using dry grasses and vegetation to line them. They sleep in these nests at night, but also retreat to these nests during the heat of the day, and use them to warm up in the winter. The nests are also used for birthing and to hide and protect newborn piglets.

Piglets are born greyish-pink in color, and develop a brown coat with faint yellow stripes along their body length before they attain their final adult coloring. Their average lifespan is between 8 and 14 years in the wild, and they become sexually mature at one or two years old. Breeding occurs seasonally before the monsoons, and after a gestation period of 100 days, females give birth to litters ranging between two and six offspring, with the average litter size being three to four piglets.

Pygmy hogs are diurnal and forage for food during the daylight hours. Foraging usually takes place for about 6 to 10 hours a day, with the pygmy hog generally taking a break midday in order to escape the high heat of the afternoon. Pygmy hogs are also omnivorous and feed primarily on roots, tubers, and other vegetative food, as well as on insects, rodents, eggs, young birds, and small reptiles.

Pygmy hogs also fulfill important ecological roles within their ecosystems, since by using their snouts to dig for food, they not only spread seeds from plants, but they also enhance the quality of the soil. They sometimes fall prey to pythons, raptors, tigers and other carnivores.

== Threats ==
The pygmy hog is considered to be one of the most threatened mammalian species and had been listed as "critically endangered" on the IUCN Red List since 2008. It has been severely and negatively impacted by loss and destruction of grassland habitat for commercial purposes, and most of the grasslands continue to be burnt annually during the dry season. In Assam, much of the pygmy hog's habitat has been converted to settlements and cropfields due to rapid human population growth. Loss and degradation of habitat has also occurred due to livestock grazing, commercial forestry and the planting of trees in the grasslands, and due to flood control schemes. In addition, the pygmy hog has been hunted for meat.

== Conservation ==
The pygmy hog is protected under Schedule I of India's Wild Life (Protection) Act, 1972, providing absolute protection with the highest penalties for offenders. The pygmy hog is also listed in CITES Appendix I, which includes all species of plants and animals threatened with extinction.

The Pygmy Hog Conservation Breeding Programme (PHCP) was formed in 1995 in order to aid the implementation of a broad conservation action for the pygmy hog and its habitat. One of the PHCP's main objectives was to implement a captive breeding and reintroduction program to prevent the extinction of the pygmy hog. Two males and four female individuals were caught under permit in Manas National Park and transferred to a facility in Basistha, where they became the founders of the current captive-breeding program. After two years, the captive population had increased by over 600%, and an additional breeding facility was established at Potasali in Nameri. The PHCP is also cooperating with forest department officials to restore and maintain the natural grassland habitat of the pygmy hog.

The PHCP utilizes a "soft release" method in order to pre-condition the animals to survive in the wild. The pre-conditioning process takes about five months, and occurs in a specially constructed 'pre-release' facility in Potasali. While here, the pygmy hogs are divided into social groups, and live in environments simulated to resemble their natural habitat where they can engage in natural foraging, nest-building, and other natural behaviors. Just prior to their release, the pygmy hogs are taken to a reintroduction site where they are maintained for two to three days to ensure their readiness before they are officially released back into the wild. Between 2008 and 2016, one hundred captive-bred pygmy hogs have been reintroduced into the wild at three different locations in Assam, these being Sonai Rupai, Orang and Barnadi National Parks. Another 60 individuals remain in captivity as a safety net population in order to reproduce pygmy hogs for future releases. In 2024, nine pygmy hogs were released into Manas National Park, increasing its population to 63 individuals.

In 2024, there were around 420 pygmy hogs in the wild and 95 in breeding centres, meaning a total of 515 pygmy hogs. They can be found in the wild in Manas National Park, Orang National Park, Sonai Rupai Wildlife Sanctuary, and Bornodi Wildlife Sanctuary. Furthermore, they are being captively-bred at two Pygmy Hog Breeding and Research Centres, one in Basistha, Guwahati, and the other near Assam's Nameri National Park.

== See also ==
- Pygmy hog-sucking louse
- Miniature pig
- Göttingen minipig
