= Bird Conservation Nepal =

Nepalese non-profit organization

- नेपाल पंक्षी संरक्षण सङ्घ
- Formation: 1982
- Purpose: conservation of birds, their habitats and site
- Headquarters: Kathmandu, Nepal
- Region served: Nepal
- Parent organization: BirdLife International
- Staff: 22
- Website: www.birdlifenepal.org

Bird Conservation Nepal (BCN; Nepali: नेपाल पंक्षी संरक्षण सङ्घ, romanized: Nēpāla paṅkṣī sanrakṣaṇa saṅgha), also known as BirdLife Nepal, is a non-profit organisation founded in Nepal focusing on the conservation of birds. It was founded in 1982 and the first president was Harisaran Kazi. It has a membership of 912 people. It is a partner organizations of BirdLife International.

== History ==
Bird Conservation Nepal was originally established in the 1970's by conservationists Kazi Dai and Karna Sakya as the Nepal Bird Watching Club. It was formally founded in 1982 as Bird Conservation Nepal. It was appointed as the Country Representative for Birdlife International in 1994.

In 2006, the organization created Panchhi Sansar, a radio program in Nepal about bird conservation.

In 2012, as part of International Vulture Awareness Day, the BCN ran a photography contest for Nepalese birdwatchers. The winning photograph was that of a snowcock.

== Projects ==
=== White-rumped vulture conservation ===
In the 1990's, the BCN participated in attempts to prevent White-rumped vultures from being exposed to diclofenac, a drug sometimes used on livestock. In 2007, they created a series of "vulture restaurants", including the Jatayu vulture restaurant, to provide the vultures with carrion uncontaminated by diclofenac. To acquire clean food for the vultures, the BCN bought ill cattle from local villagers that had not been treated with diclofenac. They paid US$3 per animal, and then used culture-safe painkillers on them. Vulture nesting activity increased near the feeding stations. To increase tourism, viewing stations were set up near the stations and tourists were allowed to parahawk with the birds, the proceeds of which BCN used to fund their activities. In 2008, they created a vulture breeding centre in Chitwan National Park. BCN originally planned to stock the centre with 10 breeding pairs of white-rumped vultures and Slender-billed vultures captured during the early spring. In 2017, released the first set of captive-born vultures into Nepal and tracked them. After a year in the wild, none of the birds had been killed by diclofenac.

In the mid 2000's, the BCN worked with the Royal Society for the Protection of Birds to give Nepalese farmers alternatives to diclofenac.

BCN maintains a database of tagged vultures in Nepal.

=== Bird counts ===
The BCN conducts an annual census of migratory birds living in nature reserves in Nepal. It also regularly surveys birds near Kathmandu, Pokhara, as well as in Important Bird Areas and bird habitats near major infrastructure projects. In 2005, they performed the first local survey of pheasants in the Pipar Pheasant Reserve.

In 2022, BCN created the birdwatching app Chhimeki Chara (Nepali: छिमेकी चरा), which allowed its users to submit data on birds they saw in Nepal for a bird count modeled after the Great Backyard Bird Count.

== Publications ==
- Pheasant Conservation Action Plan for Nepal (2019-2023), 2022
- The State of Nepal's Birds 2010, Indicators for our changing world, 2011.

== See also ==
- BirdLife International
- List of birds of Nepal
