= Wingman =

Military pilot or UAV flying alongside a formation leader

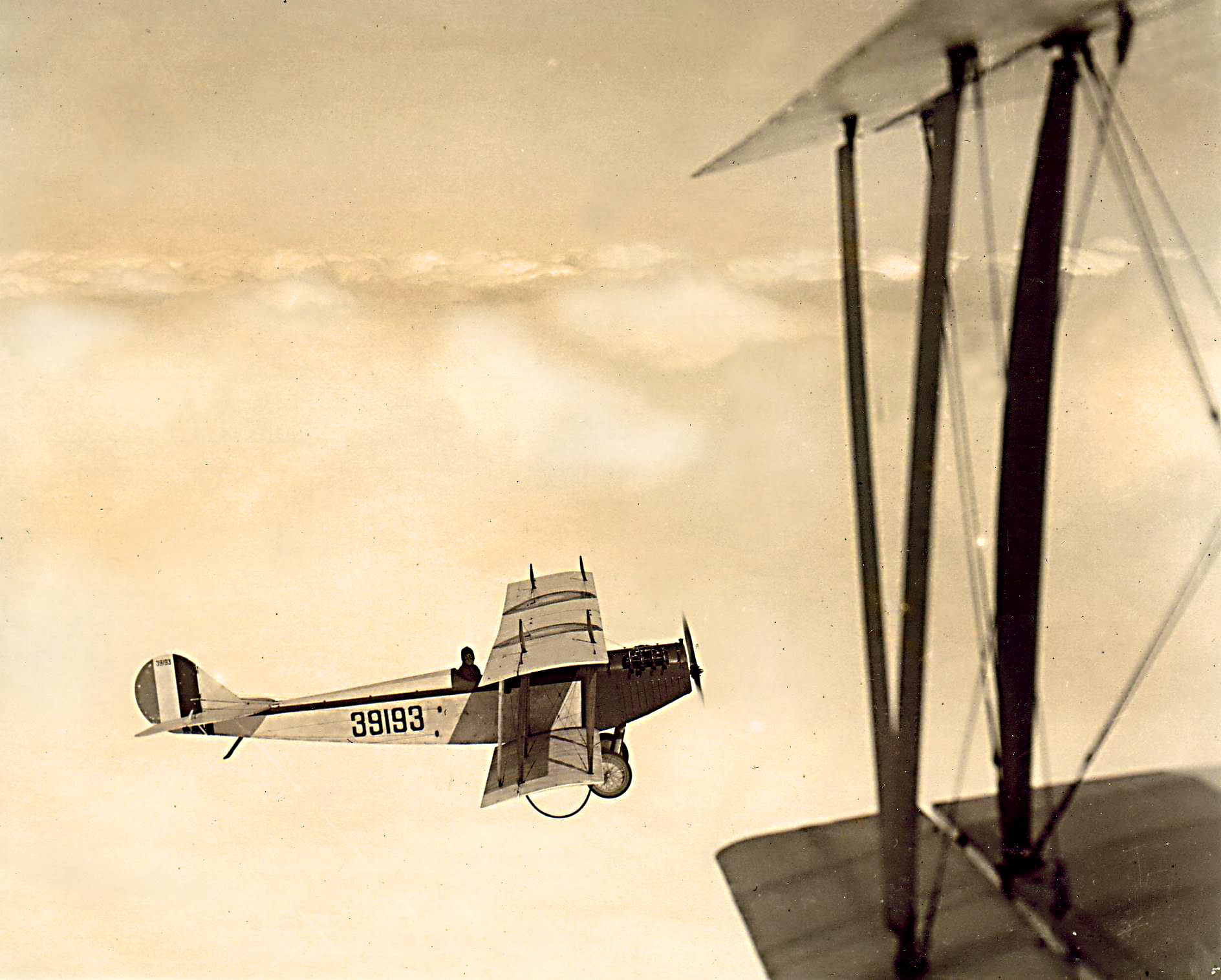
Curtiss JN-4 "Jenny" formation

A wingman (or wingmate) is the pilot of a secondary aircraft providing support or protection to a primary aircraft in a potentially dangerous situation, traditionally flying in formation to the side and slightly behind the primary craft. The term is sometimes used in reference to the secondary aircraft itself, particularly when it is an unmanned aerial vehicle (UAV) rather than human-piloted plane.

According to the U.S. Air Force,

The traditional military definition of a "Wingman" refers to the pattern in which fighter jets fly. There is always a lead aircraft and another which flies off the right wing of and behind the lead. This second pilot is called the "Wingman" because they primarily protects the lead by "watching his back."

== Description ==
The wingman's role is to support aerial combat by making a flight both safer and more capable: amplifying situational awareness, increasing firepower, and allowing more dynamic tactics.

=== Origins ===
The concept of a wingman is nearly as old as fighter aviation. On 9 August 1915, Oswald Boelcke was already acting in the role when he shot down a French airplane pursuing Max Immelmann.

Colonel Robert Smith provided an extensive description of the work and role of wingmen during the Korean War. Among a wingman's primary responsibilities are remaining close to the leader of the aerial formation and warning the leader of any immediate threats at the cost of losing mutual protection. Smith described the responsibilities as mutually exclusive: to never lose the leader requires that the wingman watch what is in front of them while warning the leader of threats requires focusing on the rear. In order to protect the leader, the wingman needs to react constantly according to his surroundings and movements. Smith described the difficulties of flying under conditions of poor visibility and the trying effects on human perception under such conditions, especially considering the danger of becoming separated from the formation leader. According to Smith, wingmen are expected to remain with the leader, even at the cost of giving up an easy kill.

=== Unmanned aerial vehicles as wingmen ===
The development of UAVs led to the development of such vehicles as "loyal wingmen" flying in formation with a manned fighter aircraft serving in various supporting roles.

The European development project FCAS includes such UAVs.

The Chinese Feihong Company under the Ninth Academy of the state-owned China Aerospace Science and Technology Corporation presented an upgraded version of its "loyal wingman" FH-97A at the 2022 Zhuhai Airshow.

The Boeing MQ-28 Ghost Bat is another example.

== See also ==
- Finger-four – Fighter aircraft flight formation
- Index of aviation articles
- Parahawking – Paragliding with falconry
- Vee formation

== Bibliography ==
- Werner, Johannes (2009). Knight of Germany : Oswald Boelcke German ace. Havertown, Pa.: Casemate. ISBN 978-1-61200-043-5. OCLC 783210892.
