= Ram and Laxman (elephants) =

Twin Asian elephants born in Nepal

- Species: Asian elephant (Elephas maximus)
- Sex: Male (both)
- Born: 6 November 2008 (age 18); Khorsor Elephant Breeding Centre, Sauraha, Chitwan District, Nepal
- Nationality: Nepal
- Known for: Rare twin Asian elephants; depicted on the Nepalese thousand-rupee note
- Residence: Chitwan National Park
- Parents: Romeo (father); Devi Kali (mother)
- Named after: Rama and Lakshmana

Ram and Laxman (Nepali: राम र लक्ष्मण), formally known with the honorific suffix as Ram Gaj and Laxman Gaj (born 6 November 2008), are a pair of twin Asian elephants born in Khorsor Elephant Breeding Centre in Sauraha, Chitwan District, Nepal. Twin births among elephants are extremely rare, accounting for less than 1% of elephant births worldwide. In 2020, Nepal Rastra Bank featured an illustration of Ram and Laxman on the reverse side of the Nepalese thousand-rupee note.

== Currency depiction ==
The reverse of the Nepalese one thousand-rupee banknote previously featured an illustration of an African elephant. This choice was questioned because Nepal is home to its own population of Asian elephants. In 2020, the Nepal Rastra Bank introduced a redesigned banknote featuring an illustration of Ram and Laxman, first recorded twin elephants born in Nepal.

== See also ==
- Gaja
- Dhurbe
- Raja Gaj
- Chitwan National Park
