= Bijauri =

Bijauri बिजौरी
- Village Development Committee
- Location in Nepal
- Coordinates: 28°06′N 82°20′E
- Country: Nepal
- Province: Lumbini Province
- District: Dang Deokhuri District

Population (1991)
  - Total: 9,729
- Time zone: UTC+5:45 (Nepal Time)

Bijauri is a town and Village Development Committee in Dang Deokhuri District in Lumbini Province of south-western Nepal. At the time of the 1991 Nepal census it had a population of 9,729 persons living in 1599 individual households.

This is the place where vulture conservation has been done as Vulture Restaurant located 5 km north of Tulsipur - Ghorahi highway in Salapani village. Few km. north of Vulture Restaurant in Chillikot there is ancient temple of Kalika and Malika Devi as well as there is also damaged ancient palace of a king.

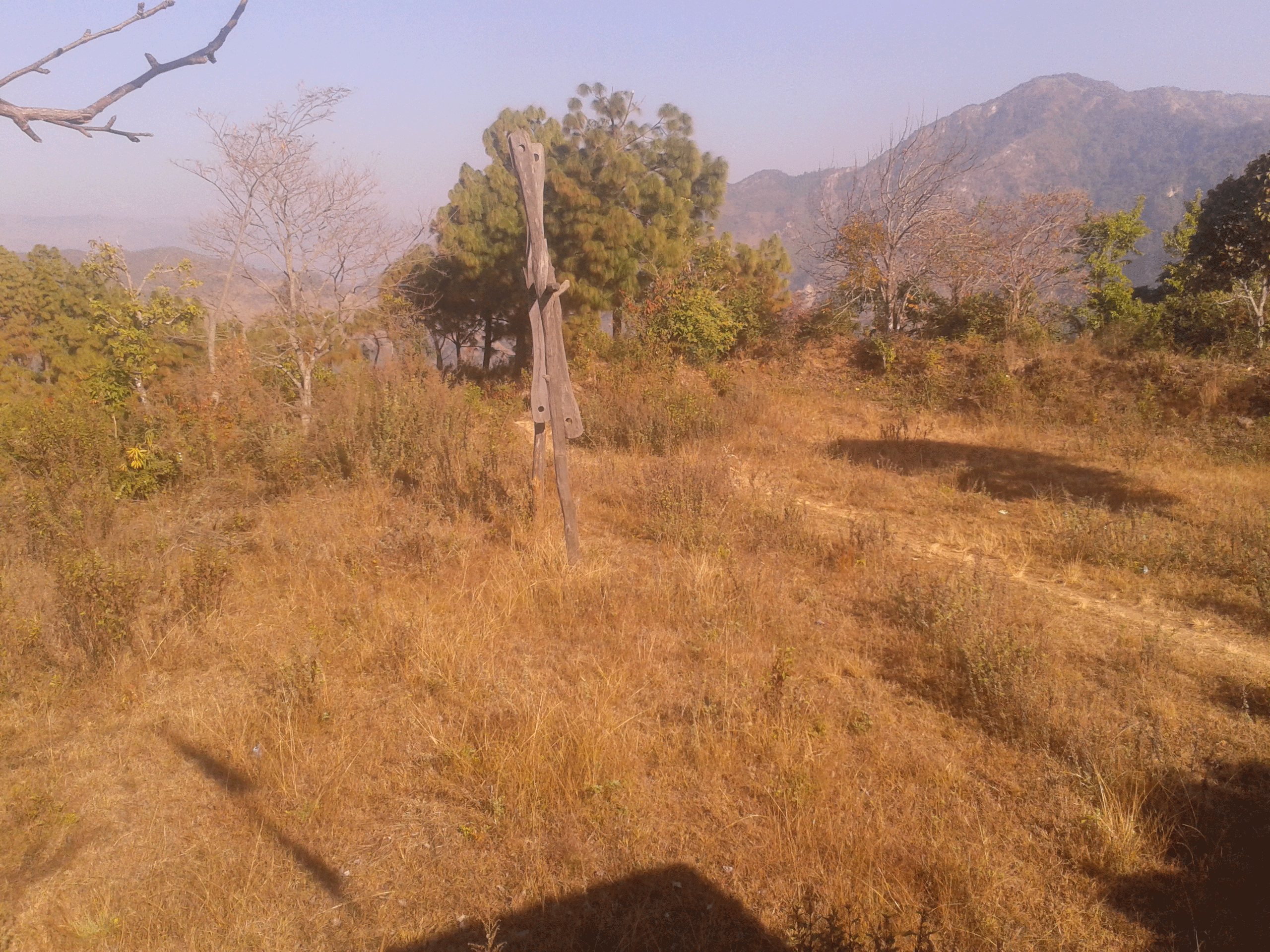
Roteping in Chillikot

Nepal Sanskrit University is also situated here. There is also ostrich farm in this V.D.C.
