= Jatayu vulture restaurant =

Vulture conservation center in Nepal

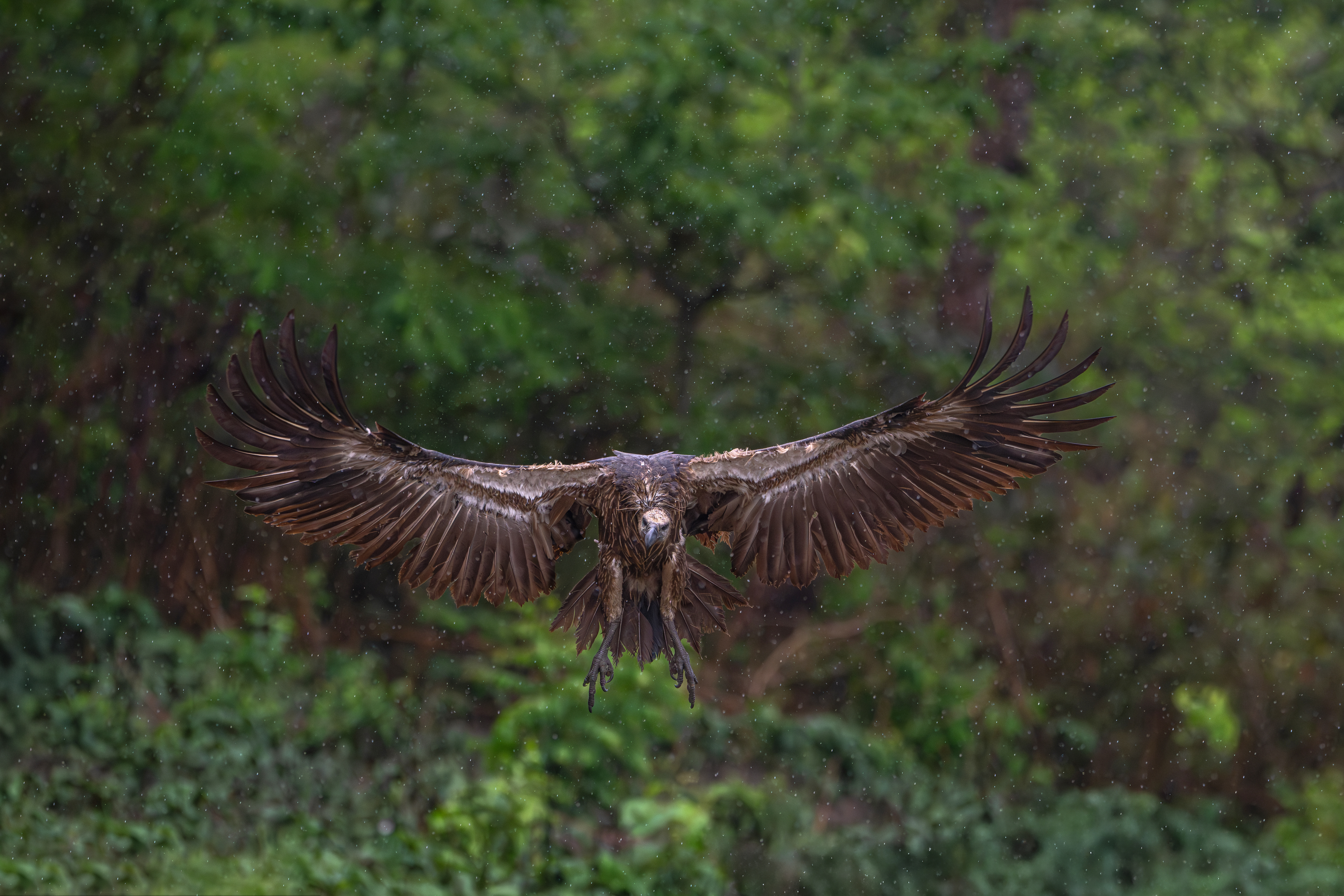
White-rumped Vulture in the rain at Jatayu Vulture Restaurant.

Jatayu vulture restaurant is the first community managed vulture restaurant in the world. It is located in Pithauli of Nawalparasi district in Nepal in the buffer zone of Chitwan National Park. It was established in 2006. It provides safe food to vulture. The facility attracts tourists and conservationists from around the world. The vultures fed at this place has been tracked to have reached up to Pakistan.

== Background ==
The estimated vulture population in 1980s was over one million in Nepal. It was drastically decreased to around 20,000. Nine species of vulture is found in Nepal. Among them four type of vultures namely white-rumped vulture, slender-billed vulture, red-headed vulture and Indian vulture has been listed as critically endangered, the Egyptian vulture is listed as an endangered species while other the bearded vulture, cinereous vulture and Himalayan griffon are listed as near threatened.

The decrease was mainly attributed to diclofenac which is used to treat animal disease. In 2006, Nepal government banned the use of diclofenac.

Seeing the decreasing condition of vultures, Dhan Bahadur Chaudhary established the country's first vulture restaurant in Pithauli and named it Jatayu Restaurant in 2006 with the support from an organization called Bird Conservation Nepal. The term restaurant was chosen to attract young people on conservation. The term Jatayu means a vulture god from Hindu mythology. The idea of vulture restaurant was taken from the African models of 1960s.

Prior to the establishment, vultures used to be transferred from the Vulture Conservation Centre which was run inside Chitwan National Park. The restaurant helped the birds to adjust to live independently and then release them to the wild.

The restaurant completely replaced the vulture breeding center at Chitwan National Park in 2022. The center at the Chitwan National Park which was started in 2008, stopped working in 2022 because it was not considered to be impactful as only 18 birds were hatched in 14 years. The vulture breeding program was also transferred to the Jatayu Restaurant. On the closing time, ten vultures were transferred to the Jatayu Restaurant.

== Feeding the vultures ==
The center buys old cattle such as cows, buffalos, and other livestock which have become an economic burden for the farmers and take care of them until they die. After they die naturally, the carcass is fed to the vultures.

The carcass is prepared in a cage to attract vultures. Then the carcass is put in field where they eat it. Regularly, the carcass is checked for diclofenac.

== Revenue generation ==
The restaurant is sometimes funded by UNDP small grants program and other organizations such as the International Trust for Nature Conservation and the Royal Society for the Protection of Birds.

The center also generate revenue by selling cattle skin and excreta for compost, and hospitality activities such as homestay for tourists and researchers. The leftover bone are collected and sold to chicken feed manufacturer.

== Impact ==
Due to the conservation effort, the number of white-rumped vultures have significantly increased between 2014 and 2017.

The vultures fed at this place has been tracked to have reached up to Pakistan.

== Other vulture restaurants in Nepal ==
Other conservation centers (or restaurants) have also opened across Nepal such as in Rupandehi, Dang, Kailali, Kaski and Sunsari. Some of them are listed below.

- Vulture restaurant in Kawasoti, Nawalparasi
- Vulture restaurant Dang: Dang has two centers. One is located in Lalmatiya near the Bhalubang town. It shares the Kalika Community Forest. The second one lies about 7 km from Tulsipur. It lies inside the Syalapani in Bhulke Community Forest.
- Vulture restaurant in Kailali: It is located in Khutiya about 8 km from Attariya in the bank of Khutiya River inside Samaiji Community Forest.
- Vulture restaurant in Rupandehi: It is located in Khutiya near Gaidahwa Lake inside the Lumbini Farmland Important Bird and Biodiversity and the Gaidatal Community Forest.
- Vulture Restaurant in Kaski: It is located in Ghachowk near Pokhara.

== Controversies ==
The pollution caused by the remains of carcasses has been considered to be a major issue between conservationists and the locals.

== See also ==
- Jatayu Conservation Breeding Centre, Pinjore
- Vulture restaurant
