= Goltakuri =

Coordinates: 28.06508°N 82.15782°E

Goltakuri is a Village Development Committee (VDC) of Dang district, Lumbini Province, Nepal. It is situated below the Churya Range Hill from the south, Tui-Soto from the east, the Babai River from the north. It has a population of 5,293 among 2,411 are male and 2,882 are female. The household is 1,119 in number. According to population census of 2011, it is the third least populated VDC among the 2 Municipalities and 39 VDCs of Dang district.

Three sides are surrounded by water sources to the east, west and north. The eastern part of Goltakuri is not irrigated due to the high level of the farm land from the water resources. The western part is supplied by irrigation from the Babai River. Most of people of here are engaged in farming. Youngsters are in different parts of the Middle-East and Malaysia, employed to force, others go to India for the sake of employment.

Tharu are the largest number, Brahman, Kshetri, and so-called lower cast people also live here. The place of trade is the regional center Tulsipur which is 16 Kilometer(KM) (10 Miles) from here followed by 4 km graveled road and 12 km blacked topped road of Rapti Highway.
