= Nepalese thousand-rupee note =

Nepalese highest-denomination banknote

One Thousand Rupees एक हजार रुपैयाँ
- Country: Nepal
- Value: रू 1000 (pegged to ₹625)
- Width: 172 mm
- Height: 70 mm
- Security features: Windowed security thread, rhododendron watermark, intaglio printing, fluorescent fibers, latent image
- Material used: Cotton paper
- Years of printing: 2008–present (Current design); 1969–2007 (Monarchy series)

Obverse
- Design: Mount Everest (Sagarmatha), Swayambhunath Stupa, and Hariti Mata Temple
- Designer: Nepal Rastra Bank
- Design date: 2008; 18 years ago

Reverse
- Design: Twin Asian elephants (Ram and Laxman) from Nepal
- Designer: Nepal Rastra Bank
- Design date: 2020; 6 years ago

The Nepalese one thousand-rupee banknote (रु 1000) is the highest denomination of the Nepalese rupee. The note is currently in circulation and is used for high-value transactions throughout Nepal.

The denomination was first introduced during the monarchy of Nepal and featured portraits of the king. Following the abolition of the monarchy in 2008, the Nepal Rastra Bank introduced a new series replacing the royal portrait with an image of Mount Everest.

The current issue, released in 2020, features twin Asian elephants on the reverse, specifically depicting "Ram and Laxman," twin elephants born at Chitwan National Park. This change was made to replace the previous design, which had accidentally featured an African elephant rather than the native Asian species.
