= Raja Gaj =

Tallest Asian elephant in modern times

Raja Gaj in the 1990s

Raja Gaj (king elephant) (c. 1937 – 2007?) was a large Asian elephant that lived in the Bardiya National Park in Nepal. He is considered to be one of the biggest Asian bull elephants of modern times with an estimated height of 11 feet 3 inches (3.43 metres) tall at the shoulder, around two feet taller than the average Asian elephant. He went missing from his habitat in southwestern Nepal, in December 2007 and was never seen again. He was estimated to be 70 years old at the time of his disappearance.

Raja Gaj was the subject of scientific speculation due to his sheer size and peculiarly domed head which led some to wonder if he might be a genetic throwback to extinct species such as the mammoths and stegodonts. However, a DNA test later confirmed it was a "regular" Asian elephant. The giant bull was the Bardiya National Park's main attraction.

== See also ==
- Dhurbe
- Ram and Laxman (elephants)
- List of individual elephants
