= Dhurbe =

Male elephant that killed 25 people in Nepal

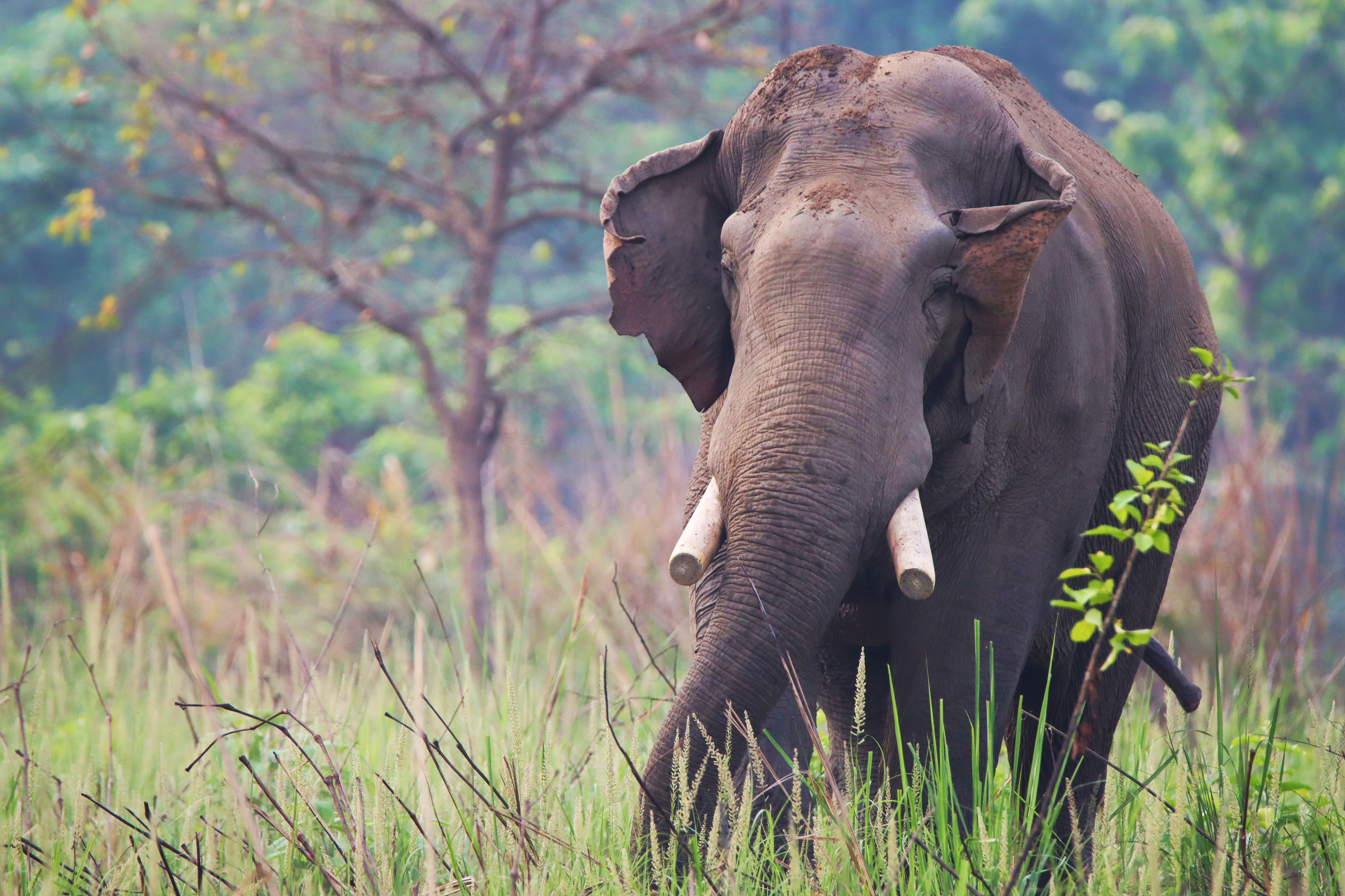
- Dhurbe spotted in Chitwan National Park
- Species: Elephas maximus (Asian elephant)
- Sex: Male
- Born: Chitwan, Nepal
- Nationality: Nepal
- Known for: Attacks on humans and property

Dhurbe (Nepali: धुर्बे) is a wild male elephant in Chitwan National Park, Nepal. Between 2009 and 2026, he was reported to have killed 25 people and destroyed more than 50 houses. Named after a soldier he killed, Dhurbe is considered one of the most notorious wild elephants in the world.

After the initial attacks from 2009 to 2012, Dhurbe was radio-collared to track his movements, but the radio stopped working after a few weeks. When the elephant killed more people in 2012 officials declared him as a mad elephant and decided to hunt and kill him. 93 soldiers from the Nepal Army and Chitwan National Parks were mobilized to kill the elephant but they could not locate him. Later, the officials claimed that Dhurbe was injured but ran away and survived.

Dhurbe next appeared in 2018. He broke into the army post of Chitwan National Park at Tirthamankali and took a female elephant with him. At the same time, Dhurbe attacked and injured a male elephant named Paras Gaj. In 2020, Dhurbe was radio collared again to track his movement. In April 2021, Dhurbe attacked a survey team who were counting rhinos. There were no casualties, but the survey was disrupted. In October 2021, he reappeared and was accompanied by a female elephant. In December 2023, in Chitwan National Park, a radio transmitter was installed in his collar for the third time.

In January 2024, Dhurbe was again reported to be terrorizing local homes near Chitwan National Park. In September 2025, the elephant again demolished local homes. Although no human casualties were reported, the incident caused significant property damage and renewed concerns over human–wildlife conflict in the region.

== 2026 attack ==
On 4 July 2026, Dhurbe attacked a house in Jagatpur, Bharatpur Metropolitan City, Chitwan, killing Ashika Bote and her four-year-old son, Bharat Bote. The victims belonged to the same family whose two members had previously been killed by Dhurbe in 2012, meaning four members of the same family have now been killed by the elephant over a span of 14 years. The incident renewed concerns over human–elephant conflict in Nepal and received widespread national and international media coverage.

The attack was Dhurbe's first recorded fatal attack since 2017 and increased the elephant's confirmed human death toll to 25 since 2010. Following the killings, local residents staged protests and blocked roads, demanding immediate action from the government and wildlife authorities. Protesters called for stronger measures to protect communities living around Chitwan National Park, while some demanded that Dhurbe be captured or euthanised to prevent further fatalities.

== Conservationist views and critiques ==
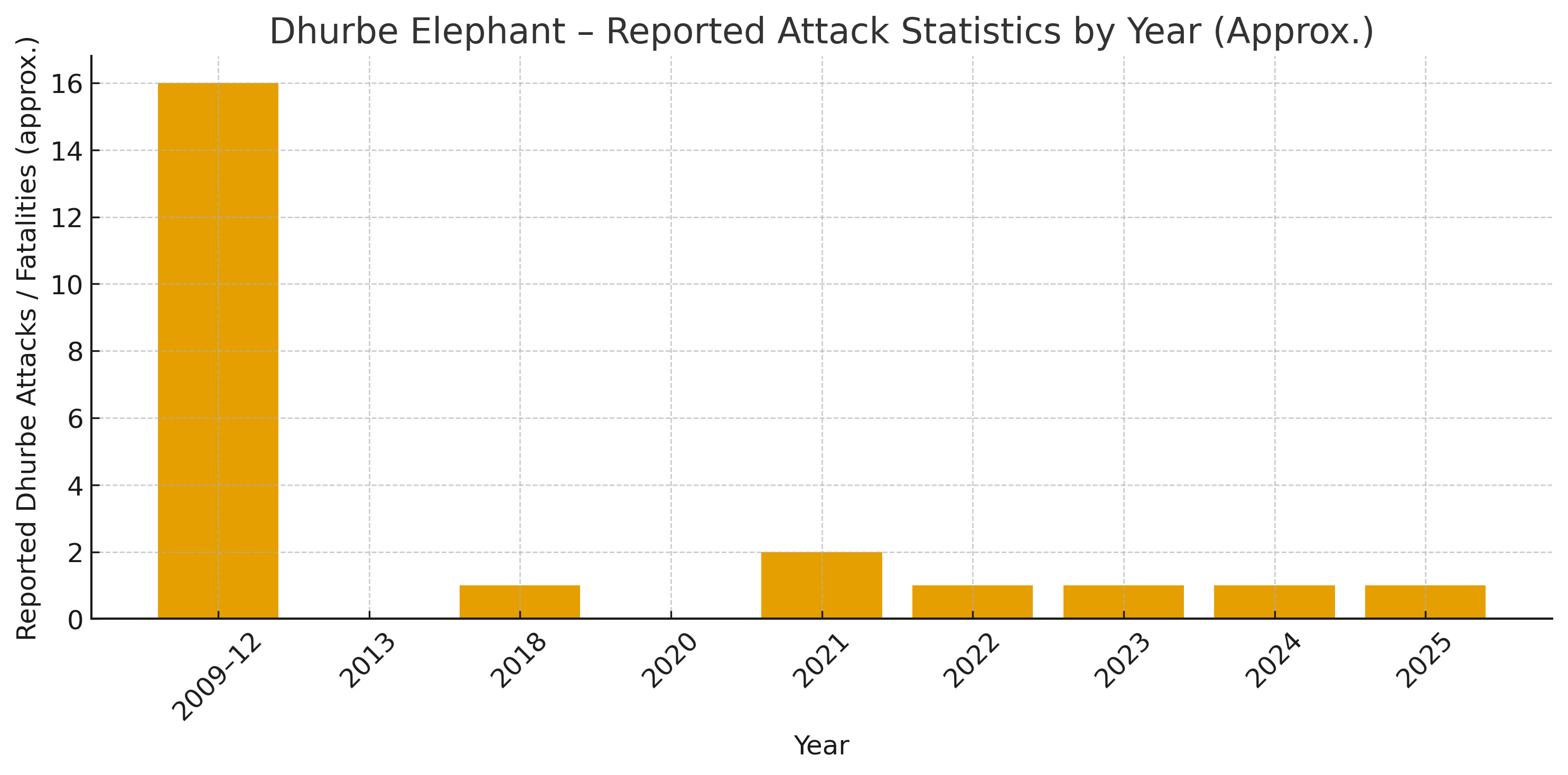
Dhurbe attacks chart

Conservationists and wildlife experts have opposed the culling of individual "rogue" elephants such as Dhurbe, arguing that such actions violate ethical standards and international agreements protecting endangered species, including Nepal's commitments under the CITES. In Nepal, the Asian elephant (Elephas maximus) is legally protected under the National Parks and Wildlife Conservation Act, 1973. Researchers assert that aggressive behaviour in elephants often arises from habitat loss and fragmentation — caused by human expansion and agricultural encroachment — rather than “rogue” traits.

== Popular culture ==
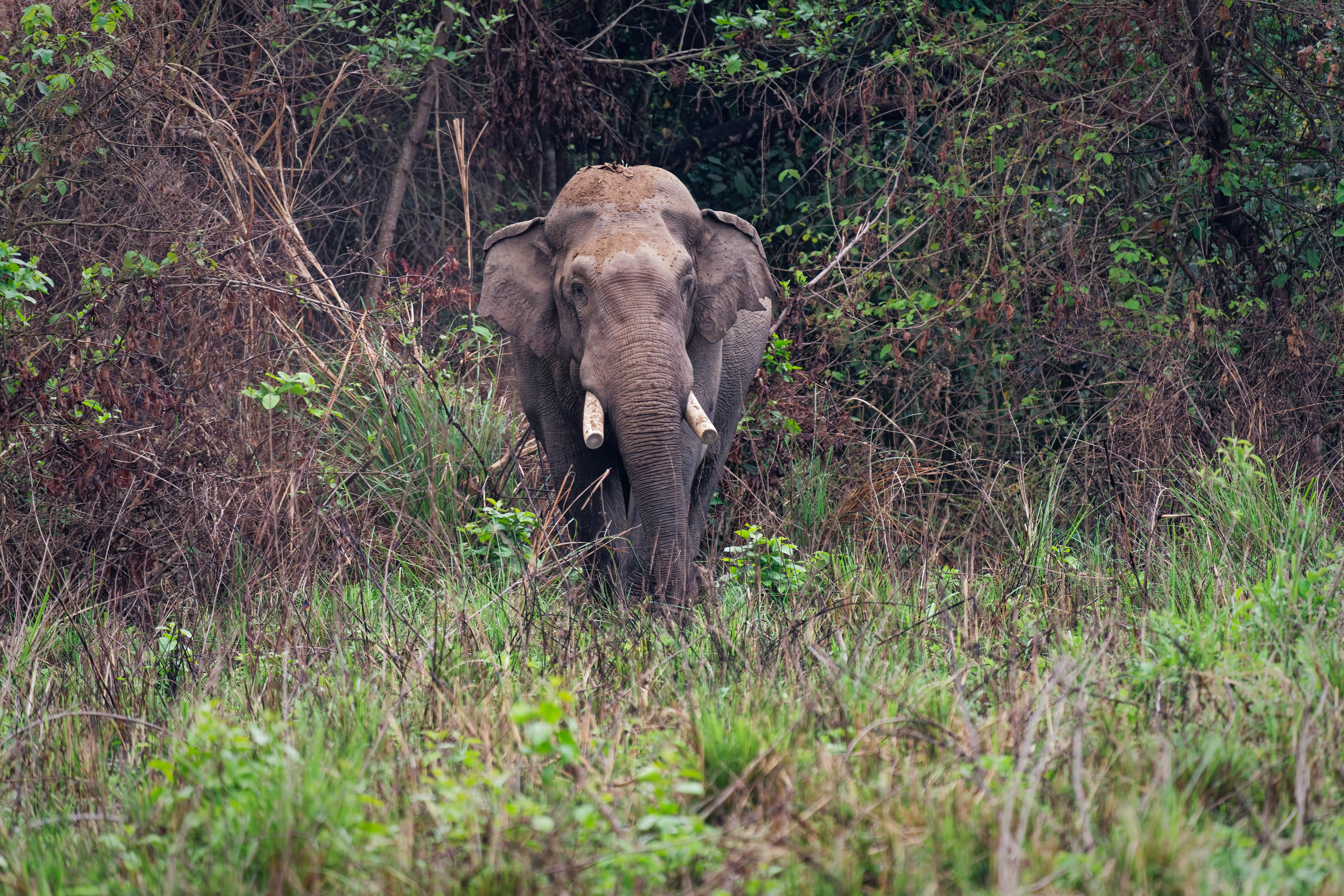
Dhurbe

Dhurbe has become a widely recognized figure in Nepalese media. Local newspapers and television channels have repeatedly reported on his activities since the early 2010s, often portraying him as both a threat and a symbol of the challenges of human–wildlife coexistence. The elephant has also been referenced in local folklore and conversations as a notorious character, making him one of the most infamous wild elephants in modern Nepal.

A 2014 documentary titled Mahout – The Great Elephant Walk in Nepal was released, focusing on elephants and their mahouts in the southern plains of Nepal. While the film does not specifically feature Dhurbe, it highlights the cultural importance of elephants and the traditions of elephant keeping in the region, providing context for the broader human–elephant relationship in which Dhurbe's story is situated. BBC has also reported on the behaviour of the elephant. Following the 2026 incident, Dhurbe received widespread national and international media coverage and became a prominent subject of public interest and Google searches.

== See also ==
- Raja Gaj
- Ram and Laxman (elephants)
- List of individual elephants
