= Bardiya National Park =

National park in Nepal

- Nepali: बर्दिया राष्ट्रिय निकुञ्ज
- IUCN category II (national park)
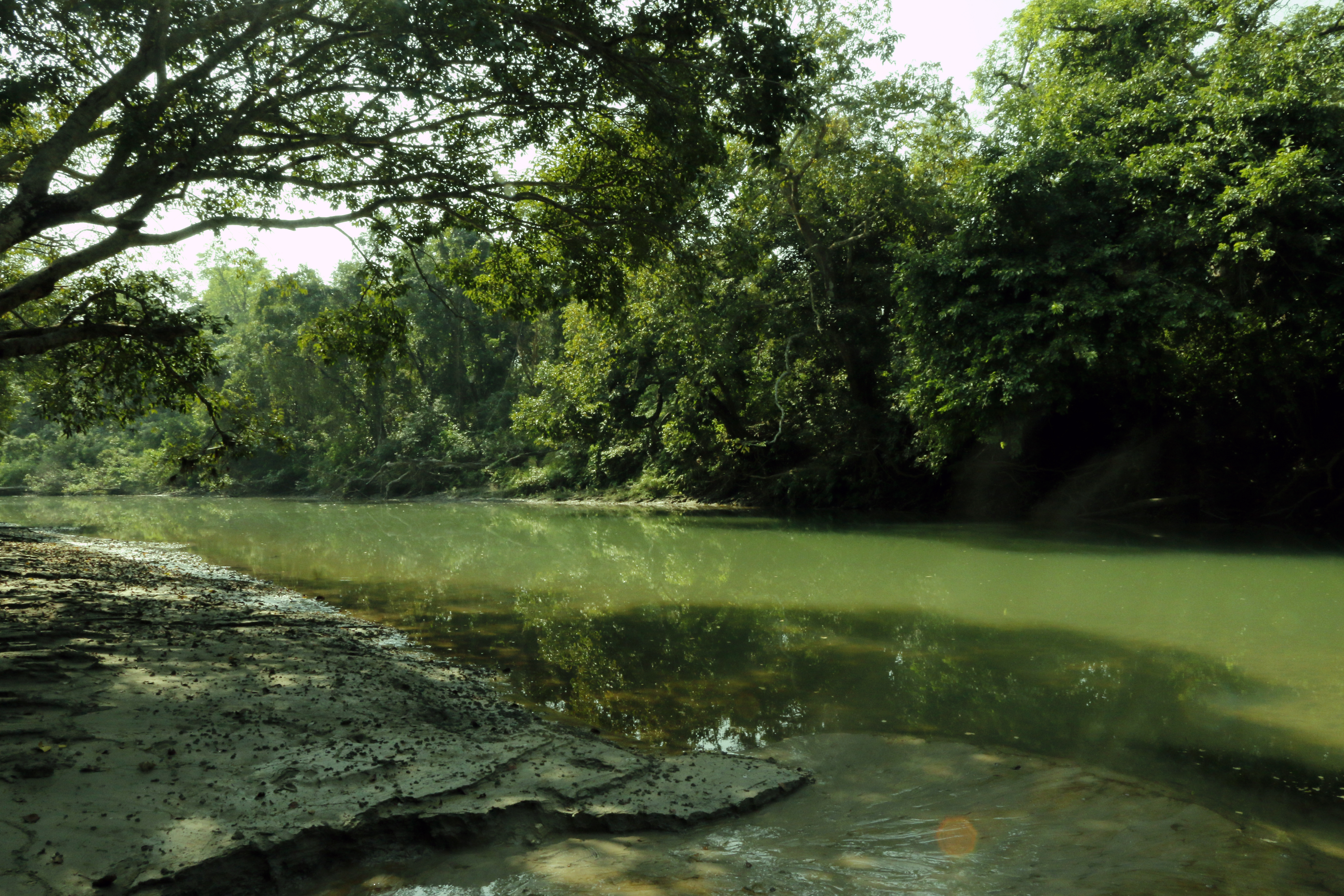

- Location within Lumbini Province Location within Nepal Location within South Asia
- Location: Nepal
- Nearest city: Gulariya
- Coordinates: 28°23′N 81°30′E
- Area: 968 km^{2} (374 sq mi)
- Established: 1988
- Governing body: Department of National Parks and Wildlife Conservation

Bardiya National Park (Nepali: बर्दिया राष्ट्रिय निकुञ्ज;) is a protected area in Nepal that was established in 1988 as Royal Bardia National Park. Covering an area of 968 km^{2} (374 sq mi) it is the largest and most undisturbed national park in Nepal's Terai, adjoining the eastern bank of the Karnali River and bisected by the Babai River in the Bardiya District.

Its northern limits are demarcated by the crest of the Siwalik Hills. The Nepalgunj-Surkhet highway partly forms the southern boundary, but seriously disrupts the protected area. Natural boundaries for human settlements are formed in the west by the Geruwa, a branch of the Karnali River, and in the southeast by the Babai River. Together with the neighboring Banke National Park, the coherent protected area of 1,437 km^{2} (555 sq mi) represents the Tiger Conservation Unit (TCU) Bardia-Banke that extends over 2,231 km^{2} (861 sq mi) of alluvial grasslands and subtropical moist deciduous forests.

== History ==
Main gate of Bardiya National Park

In 1815, Nepal lost this region to the East India Company through the Sugauli Treaty. For 45 years it was a part of British India and returned to Nepal in 1860 in recognition for supporting the suppression of the Indian Independence movement in 1857. Today, this annexed area is still called Naya Muluk meaning new country. An area of 368 km^{2} (142 sq mi) was set aside as the Royal Hunting Reserve in 1969 and gazetted as the Royal Karnali Wildlife Reserve in 1976. In 1982, it was proclaimed as the Royal Bardia Wildlife Reserve and extended to include the Babai River Valley in 1984. Finally in 1988, the protected area was gazetted as a national park.

The approximately 1500 people who used to live in this valley have been resettled elsewhere. Since farming has ceased in the Babai Valley, the naturally regenerated vegetation makes the area a prime habitat for wildlife.

== Flora ==
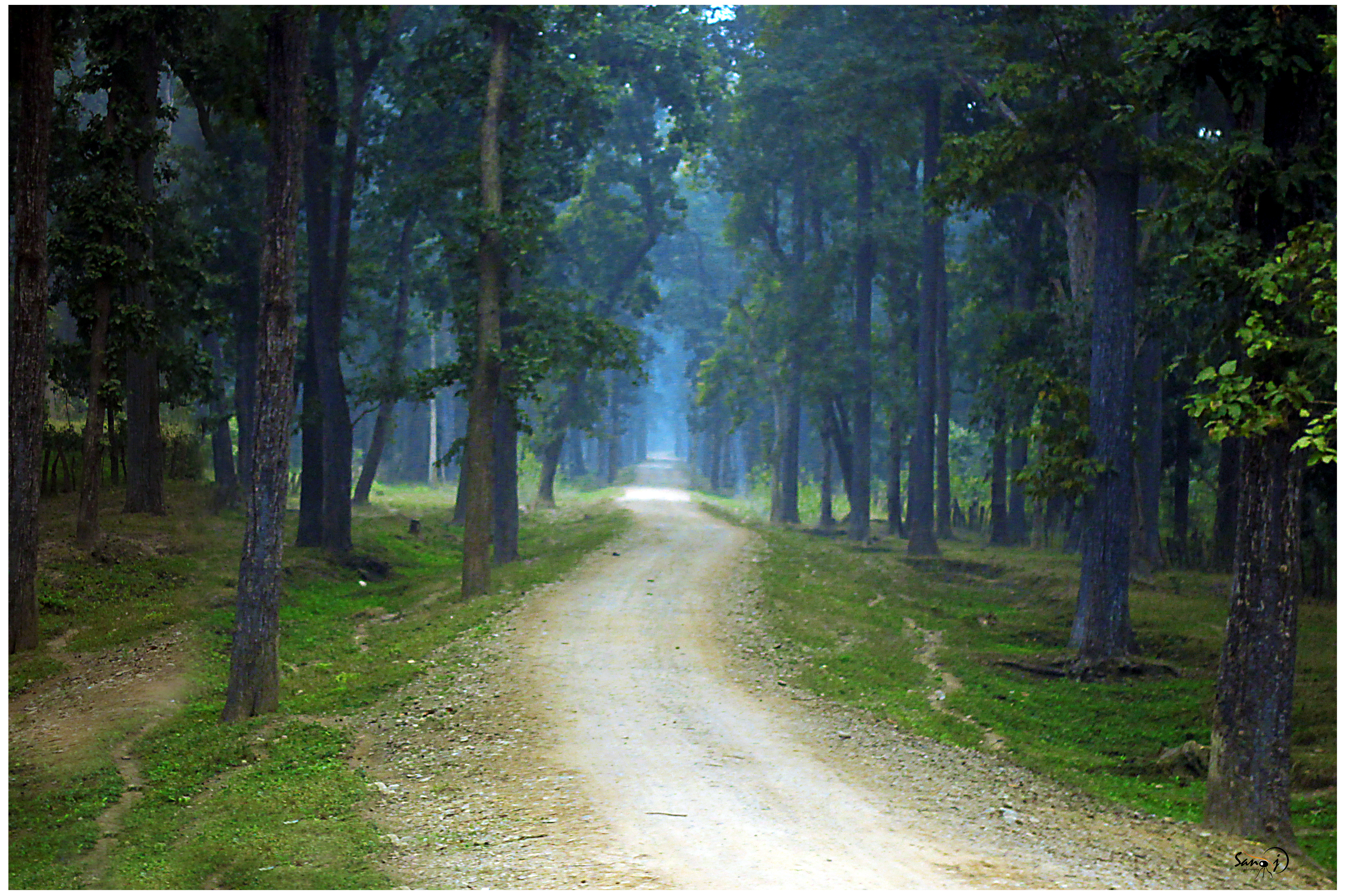
Forest in Bardiya National Park

About 70% of the park is covered with forest, with the balance a mixture of grassland, savannah and riverine forest. The flora recorded in the park comprises 839 species, including 173 vascular plant species comprising 140 dicots, 26 monocots, six ferns, and one gymnosperm species.

== Fauna ==
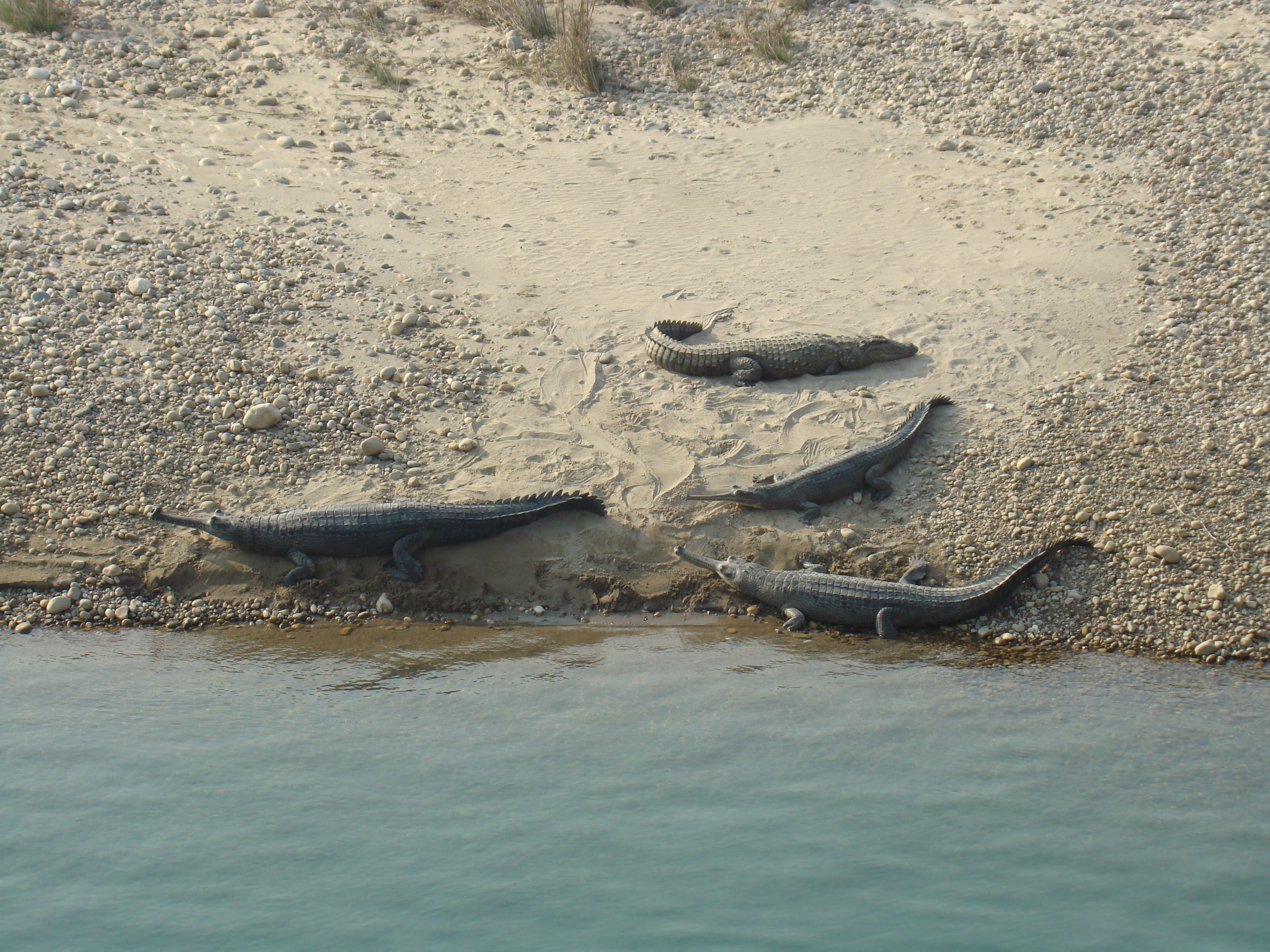
A group of gharials and a Mugger crocodile on a sand bank of the Karnali River

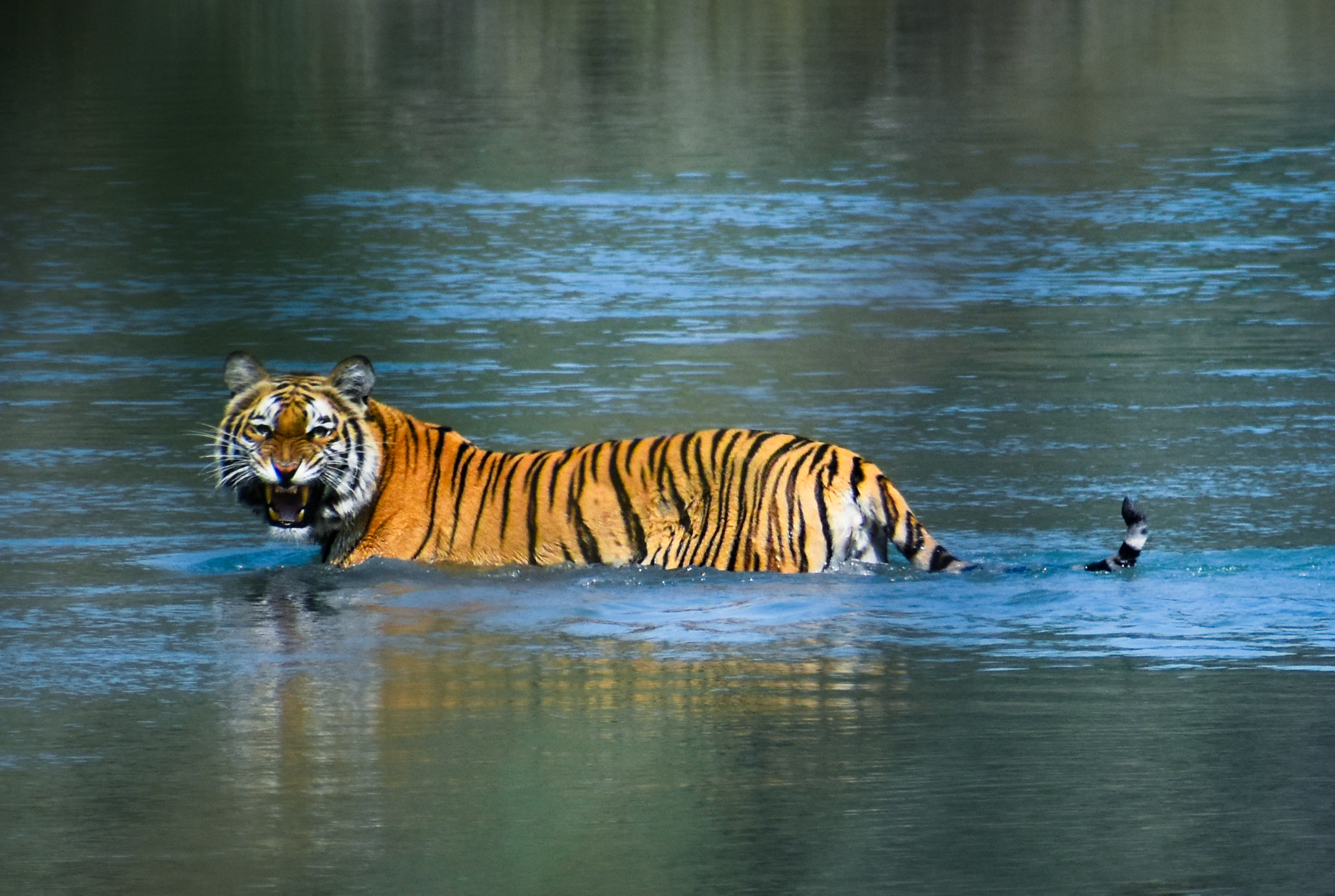
Bengal tiger in Bardiya National Park

The wide range of vegetation types in forests and grasslands provides excellent habitat for 642 faunal species. The Karnali-Babai river system, its small tributaries, and myriad oxbow lakes are habitats for 125 recorded species of fish. A small population of gharials inhabits the rivers. Apart from the mugger crocodiles, 23 reptile and amphibian species have been recorded.

=== Mammals ===
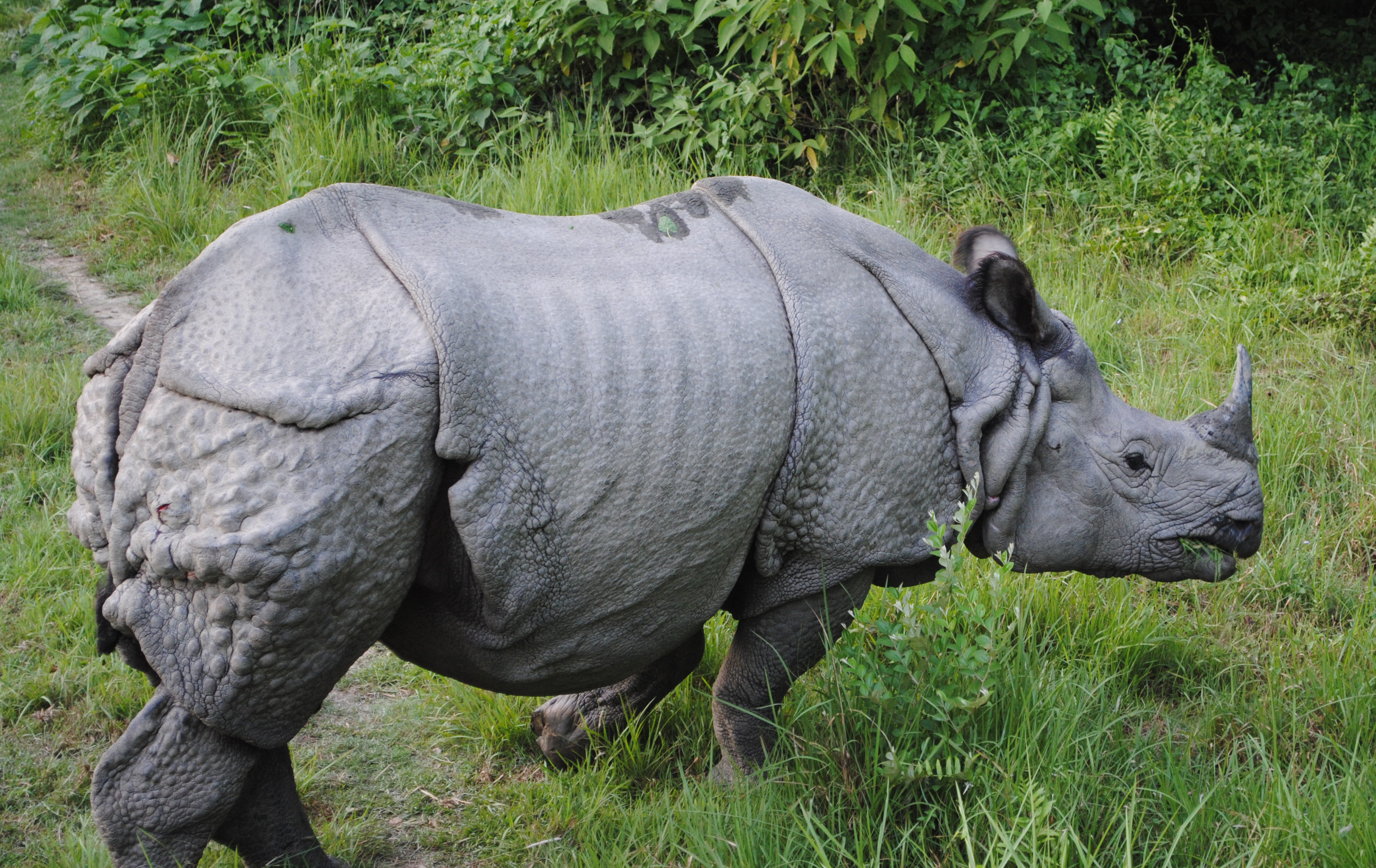
One-horned rhinoceros in Bardiya National Park

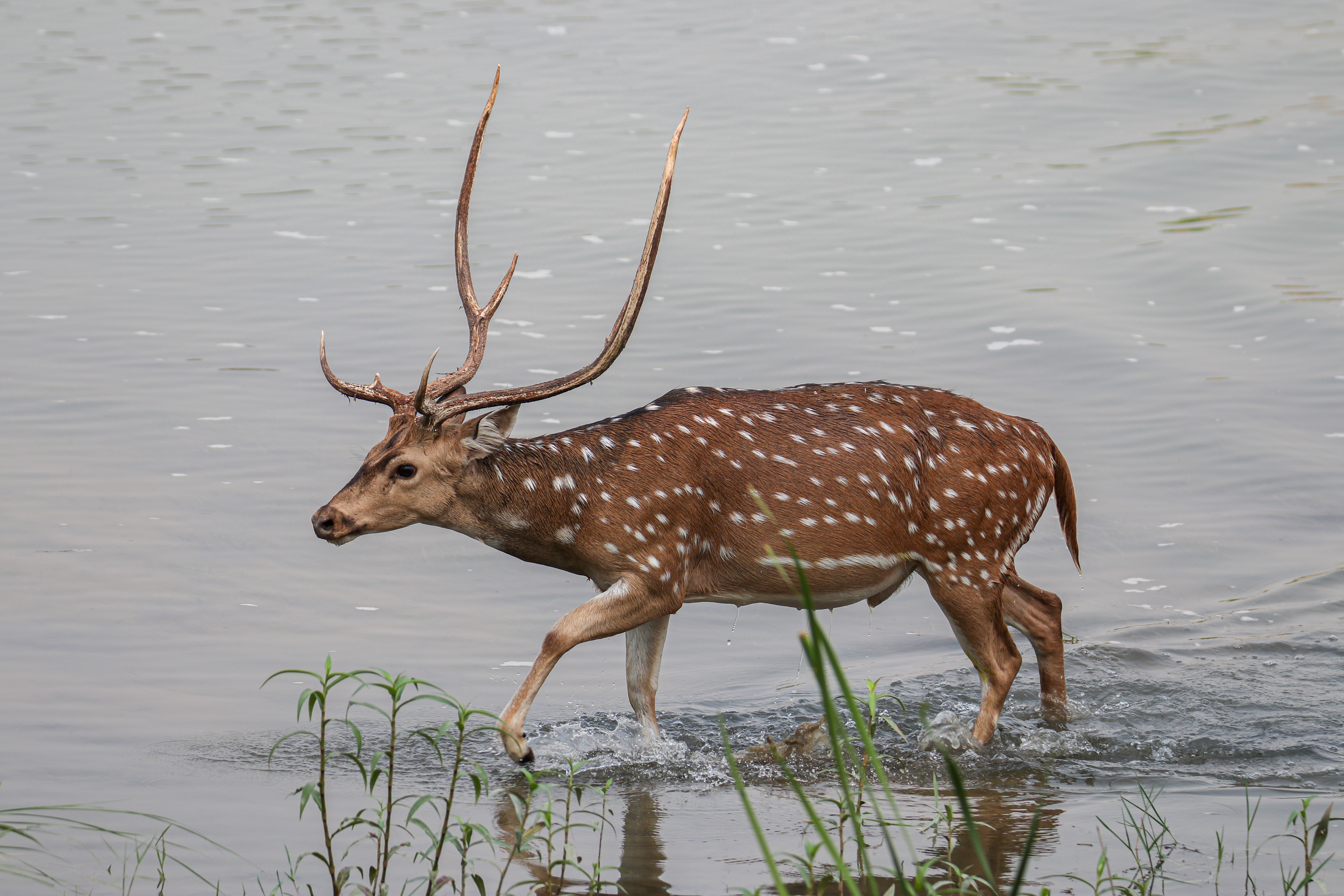
Chital in Bardiya National Park

The Bardiya National Park is home to at least 53 mammals including Indian rhinoceros, Indian elephant, Bengal tiger, barasingha, and Gangetic dolphin. A rusty-spotted cat was sighted for the time in summer 2012. A fishing cat was recorded in Babai River valley in winter 2017.

=== Tigers ===
In 2021, four tigers killed ten people and injured several others in Bardiya National Park; three were captured and transferred to rescue centers, two were housed at the rescue facility in Bardia National Park. They had broken canine teeth, possibly due to fighting between males. One of the tigers escaped from the cage and moved to the forest in Banke district. One was transferred to the Central Zoo in Kathmandu.

==== Rhinoceros ====
The translocation of rhinos from Chitwan to Bardia National Park commenced in 1986, with 58 individuals relocated until 2000. From 1994 to 2000, hunters were unsuccessful at poaching rhinos. In April 2000, there were 67 rhinos in the park, most of them resident in the Babai Valley. In May 2006, a reconnaissance survey was carried out in the Babai River floodplain, which revealed an alarming decline in the rhino population. Poaching was suspected to be the main cause of this decline. Subsequent surveys in 2007 and 2008 confirmed the complete disappearance of rhinos from Babai Valley. In different habitats of the Karnali floodplain, 25 rhinos were recorded based on direct observation and indirect signs of rhino dung and tracks. They were mostly congregated in the floodplain grassland, riverine forest and wetlands. In March 2008, only 22 rhinos were counted, and two of them were poached after the count. By 2015, the rhino population had risen to 29 individuals, mainly because of increased security measures.

==== Elephants ====
In 1985, two large elephant bulls were spotted for the first time in the park, and named Raja Gaj and Kanchha. They roamed the park area together and made occasional visits to the females. Raja Gaj stood 3.4 m (11.3 ft) tall at the shoulder and had a massive body weight. His appearance has been compared to that of a mammoth due to his high bi-domed shaped head. His forehead and domes were more prominent than in other Asian bull elephants. In 1993, five elephants were seen entering the park, and one year later another 16 individuals arrived. A population count in summer 1997 revealed 41 resident individuals. In 2002, more than 60 individuals were estimated to reside in the Karnali floodplain and the Babai Valley.

=== Birds ===
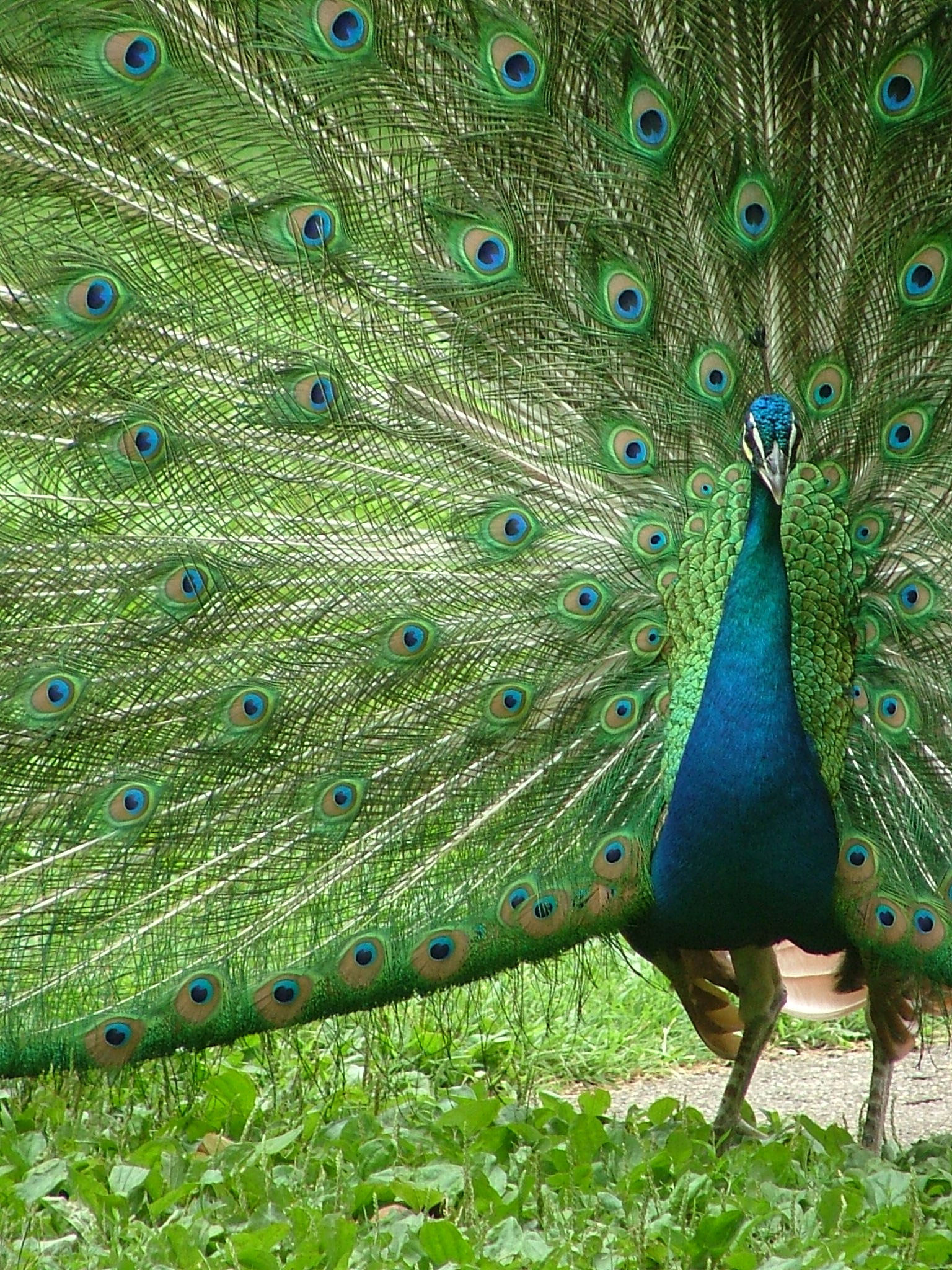
Peacock displaying his plumes

Current checklists include 407 bird species, among them the Bengal florican, white-rumped vulture, peafowl, and bar-headed geese, which are symbolic of the park. Lesser florican and sarus crane are present; grey-crowned prinia, jungle prinia, pale-footed bush warbler, aberrant bush warbler, striated grassbird, golden-headed cisticola and chestnut-capped babbler occur in the park's grasslands.
