= Babai River =

River in South Asia

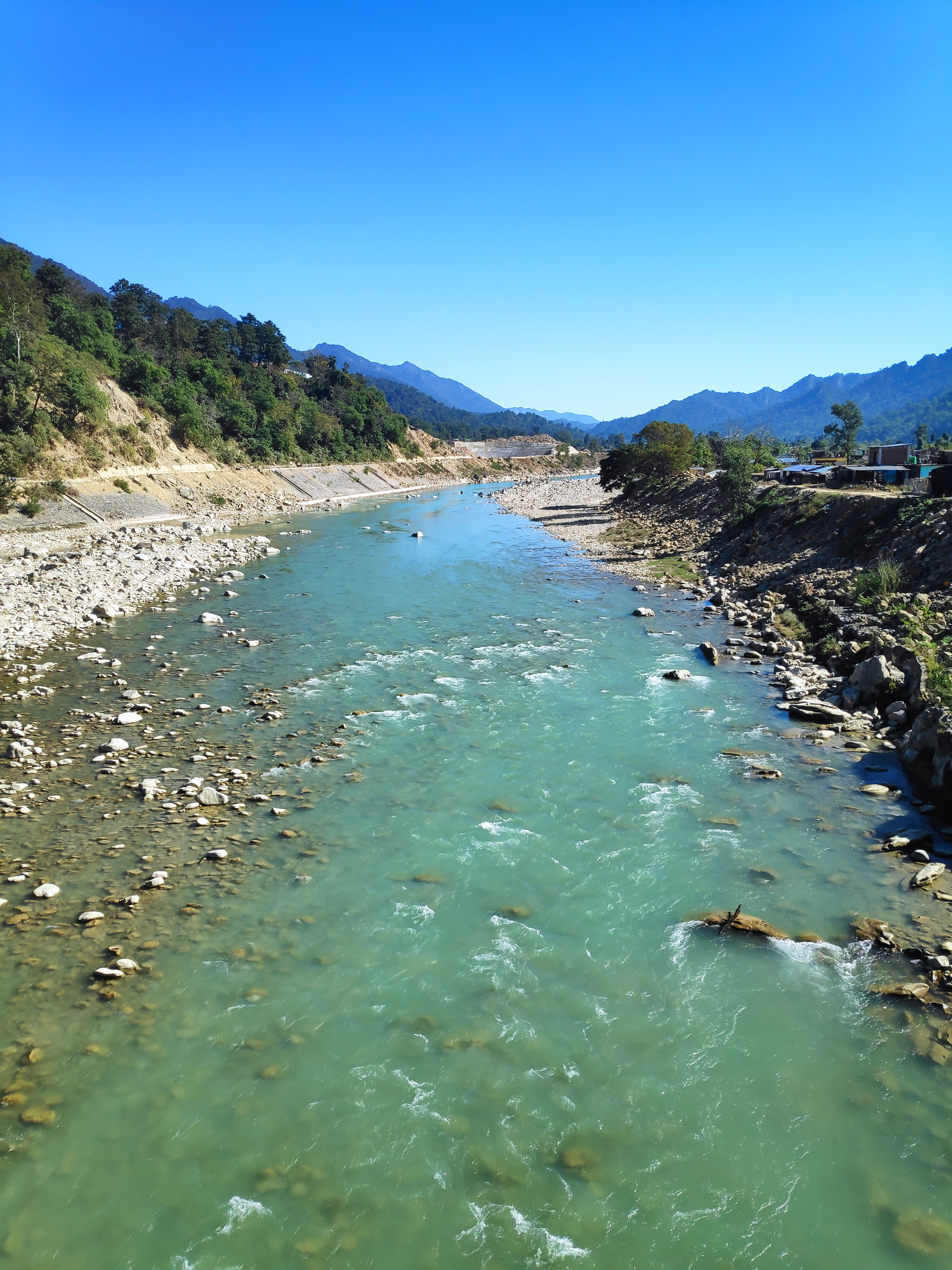
- Babai River

Location
- Country: Nepal and India
- Location: Inner Terai, Siwaliks and Terai

Physical characteristics
- Source
  - location: eastern end of Dang Valley
  - coordinates: 27°58′27″N 82°34′06″E
  - elevation: 672 m (2,205 ft)
- Mouth
  - location: at Ghaghara River WNW of Bahraich
  - coordinates: 27°44′08″N 81°17′54″E
  - elevation: 118 m (387 ft)
- Length: about 400 km (250 mi)
- Basin size: 3,500 km^{2} (1,400 sq mi)in Nepal, 200 km^{2} (77 mi^{2}) in India
- Discharge
  - average: 71 m^{3}/s (2,500 cu ft/s) (4 in April - 588 in July, at Chepang above Sharada confluence)

Basin features
- Progression: Nepal Mid-West Region: Dang, Salyan, Bardiya districts; India Uttar Pradesh Awadh region: Bahraich district
- River system: Ganges
- Tributaries
  - right: Sharada Khola

The Babai River (Nepali: बबई नदी) originates and drains in the Inner Terai Dang Valley of Mid-Western Nepal. The Dang Valley is an oval basin situated between the Mahabharat Range and the Siwalik Hills in Dang Deukhuri District. Historically inhabited by the Tharu people, the area later came under the rule of the House of Tulsipur, one of the Baise Rajya (Nepali: बाइसे राज्य), a confederation of twenty-two petty kingdoms in the Karnali (Ghagra) region. Around 1760, the Shah Dynasty annexed most of these kingdoms during the unification of Nepal, although Tulsipur’s territories south of the Siwalik Hills remained outside of their control. Owing to its higher elevation, cooler climate, and better drainage, the Dang Valley was less affected by malaria than other Inner Terai regions and was consequently settled by Shah and Rana courtiers, as well as other Pahari groups prior to the introduction of DDT for control of the Anopheles mosquito.

== Geography ==
Exiting Dang Valley and its district, the Babai enters Salyan District and flows between sub-ranges of the Siwalik Hills along their west-northwest axis. Sharada Khola drains about half of Salyan's larger Middle Hills region before cutting through the Mahabharat Range and joining the Babai from the right. About 20 kilometres (12 mi) beyond this confluence, the Babai crosses into Bardiya District and enters Bardiya National Park. The river continues another 30 kilometres (19 mi) west-northwest until the enclosing Siwalik hills fall away and the Outer Terai begins. At this point the river crosses Nepal's main east–west Mahendra Highway and exits the national park.

On the Outer Terai the Babai bends left toward the main inclination of the Indo-Gangetic Plain. The river flows south some 40 kilometres (25 mi) and enters India's Uttar Pradesh state. The Babai continues about 50 kilometres (31 mi) (straight line) south from the border before joining the much larger Ghaghara from the left at about 35 kilometres (22 mi) west-northwest of Bahraich. This confluence is about 10 kilometres (6 mi) upstream of the Sharda (Mahakali) confluence from the right.

In Nepal the catchment of the Babai is bordered by that of the Rapti on the north, east and south; and by the main Ghaghra catchment on the west until their confluence. In India the Rapti takes a more easterly course, joining the Ghagra some 285 kilometres (177 mi) southeast of the Babai's confluence.

== Conservation efforts ==
The Babai River forms part of Bardiya National Park, a protected area within Nepal’s Terai Arc Landscape that provides habitat for several endangered species. The river supports a population of the critically endangered gharial (Gavialis gangeticus); a survey in Spring 2017 recorded approximately 33 individuals along a 102 kilometres (63 mi) stretch of the river.

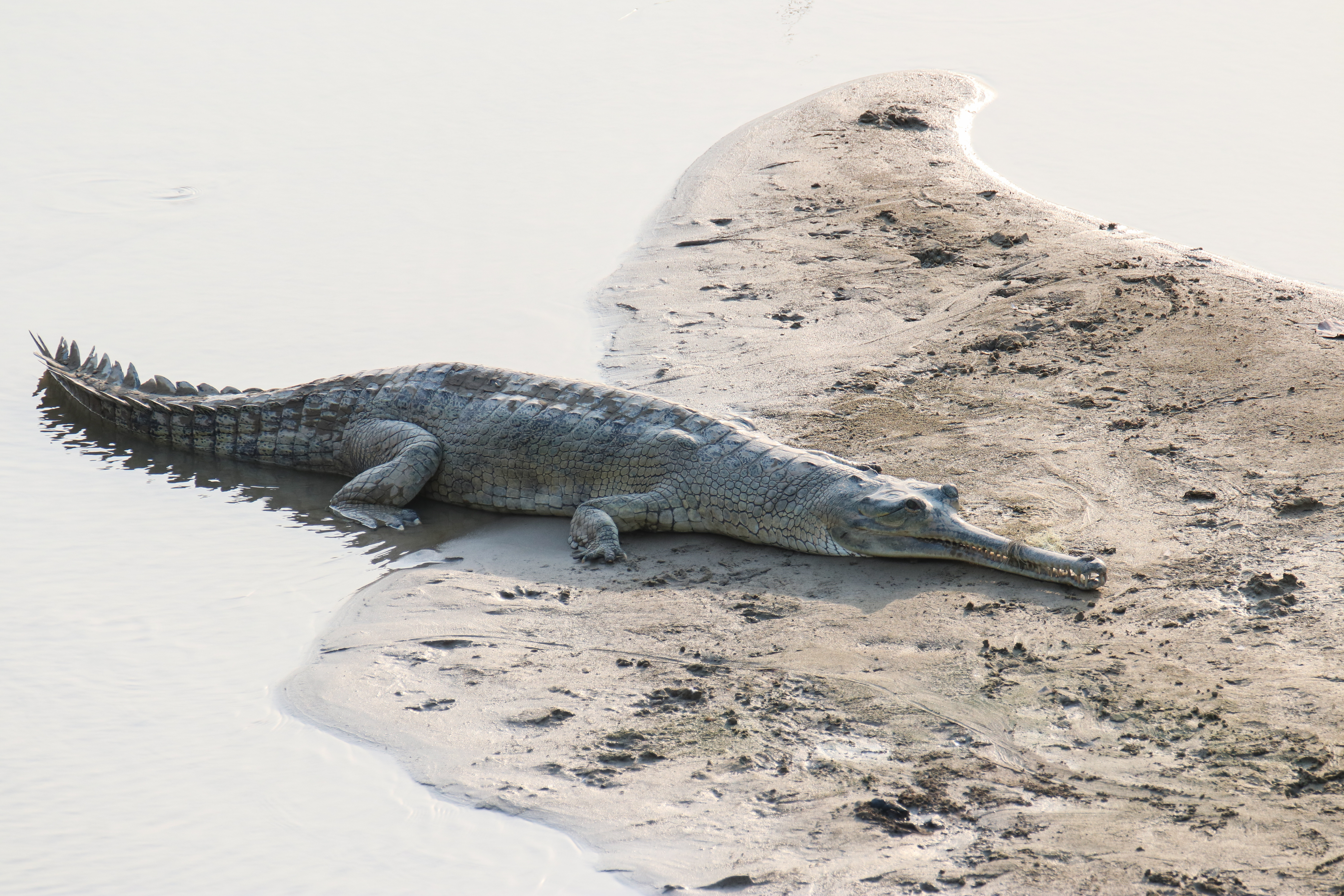
Female Gharial crocodile at Babai River, Bardiya National Park.

The Babai valley has also been the target of conservation efforts for tigers, according to Krishna Acharya, Director General of Nepal’s Department of National Parks and Wildlife Conservation, Nepal “is one of the countries in the world where the prospect of doubling the tiger population is quite good, if tigers are given enough space, prey and proper protection.”

Also being translocated into the Babai valley is the greater one-horned rhinoceros (Rhinoceros unicornis) after poachers nearly wiped out the entire population by 2006. The World Wildlife Foundation has partnered with the Nepalese government to move animals into areas with critically low populations of rhinoceros including the Babai valley in the Bardiya National Park.

== In media ==
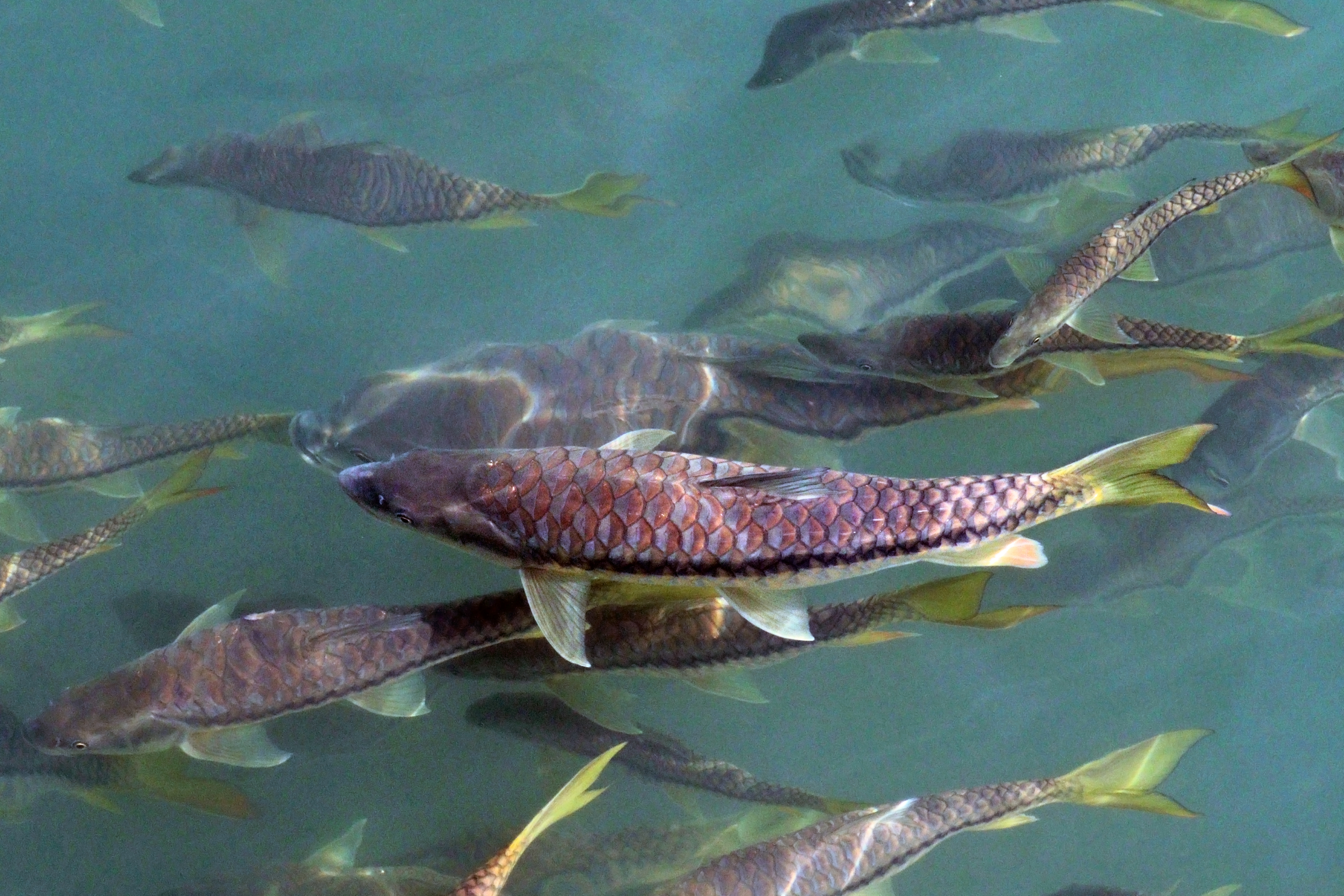
Golden mahseer (Tor putitora) Babai River

In Season 9, Episode 55 of the television series River Monsters, Jeremy Wade visits Bardiya National Park to fish goonch catfish in the Babai but was unsuccessful. Other animals featured in the episode were the golden mahseer, the gharial, and the giant snakehead.

== See also ==
- List of rivers of Nepal
- Bardiya National Park
