= Parahawking =

Paragliding with falconry

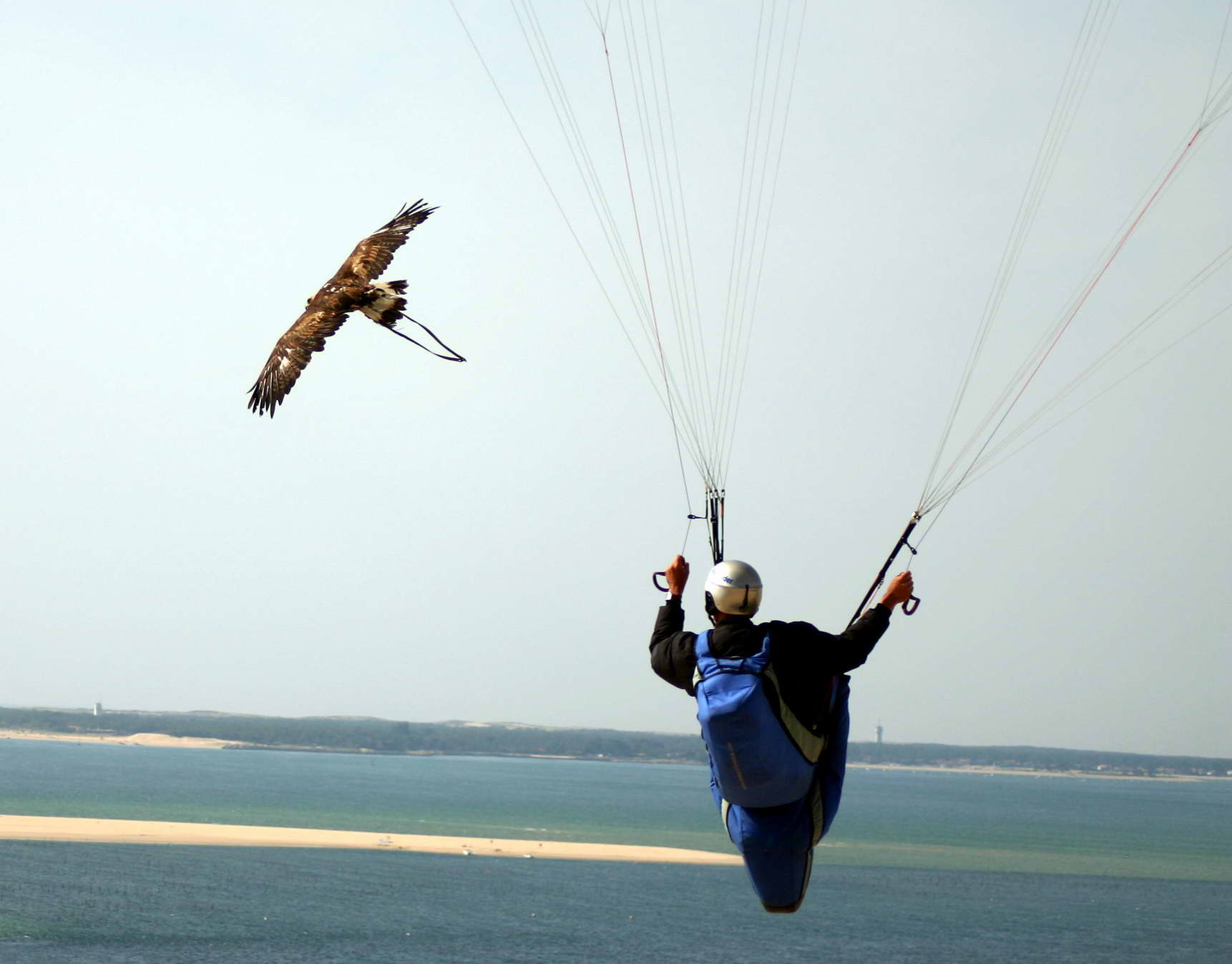
Golden eagle and paraglider

Parahawking is an activity that combines paragliding with falconry. Birds of prey are trained to fly with paragliders, guiding them to thermals.

== History ==
The roots of parahawking can be traced to aviators of the late 20th century such as naturalist Bill Lishman who in 1988 became the first person to lead the flight of geese with a light aircraft, and inspired the 1996 Columbia Pictures film Fly Away Home.

In 2002 Italian aviator Angelo d'Arrigo crossed the Sahara and the Mediterranean Sea accompanied by an eagle, in an attempt to learn from them their techniques for migratory flight, by taking advantage of thermal air currents for long-distance flight with low energy consumption.

The term 'parahawking' was coined by British falconer Scott Mason, who documented his endeavours in a film entitled Parahawking. Parahawking won the 'Air' category at the 5th Hory a Mesto International Festival of Mountain Films in Slovakia.

Other noted parahawkers include Danish, two-time paragliding world champion, Louise Crandall, whose film Flying with Eagles won first prize at the 2007 Coupe Icare film festival in St Hilaire, France.

== Controversy ==
In 2010 the Nepalese government announced that Scott Mason's Himalayan Raptor Rescue Centre in Pokhara was to be closed following allegations that it was illegally holding endangered birds and that its practice of parahawking amounted to cruelty. Despite these allegations, Mason continued to practice parahawking in Nepal until at least 2017, when the Nepalese government confiscated a number of endangered birds of prey.

== See also ==
- Birds of prey
- Falconry
- Paragliding
