= Vulture restaurant =

Feeding stations for vulture conservation

A vulture restaurant is a site where carrion, decaying flesh from dead animals, is deposited in order to be consumed by vultures, and is sometimes referred to more generally as supplemental feeding or provisioning. These stations can also be referred to as vulture feeding sites, vulture feeding stations, and vulture safe zones. This supplemental feeding practice is used to provide vultures with reliable, non-contaminated food sources or to aid in monitoring schemes. Vulture restaurants have been instituted as a method of vulture conservation in Europe and Africa since the 1960's and 70's, when vulture populations began to decline. This strategy is used because often population declines are attributed to low food availability, food contamination or insufficient nutritional quality, or feeding from human areas leading to conflict. Notably, large vulture population declines in South Asia, referred to as the Asian or Indian vulture crisis, and Africa, referred to as the African vulture crisis, have brought renewed attention to the uses and impacts of vulture restaurants. Vulture restaurants are used in Asia, Africa, Europe, and North America for various conservation and management plans. They can help combat food-derived threats to vultures, such as diclofenac or lead contamination or conflict with ranchers and poachers. The first vulture restaurant was built in South Africa in 1966. Vulture restaurants operate in a number of countries, including Nepal, India, Cambodia, South Africa, Eswatini, and Spain.

== Efficacy ==
The goal of most vulture restaurants is to decrease vulture mortality events resulting from starvation, food contamination, and human contact. Multiple programs have seen increases in vulture survival and growth in colonies following the implementation of vulture restaurants, including populations of endangered Cape Griffon vultures in South Africa and the critically endangered white-rumped vulture in Pakistan. In reintroduction programs, vulture restaurants have often been considered successful in aiding with the monitoring and wellbeing of released birds. However, vulture restaurants do not themselves address the underlying causes of vulture population crashes. Some studies find that vulture restaurants and other methods of supplemental feeding are responsible for sustaining the current vulture population levels and restaurant closures may result in population crashes. In other cases, the implementation of vulture restaurants in response to an acute crisis event, such as a severe bovine disease outbreak leading to limited safe carrion for vultures, has been successful in mitigating the crisis but created lasting changes in habitat feeding quality and scavenger behavior. In many instances, however, the efficacy of vulture restaurants is unclear due to a lack of adequate monitoring.

=== California condor ===
The California condor is a North American vulture species with an intensive reintroduction and management program. Vulture restaurants are used commonly throughout the condor's range as a means of reducing the risk of food contamination for this at-risk species and to help monitor the location and status of released individuals. Some of the leading causes of death within the condor species are connected to lead toxicity from spent ammunition and garbage ingestion. Condors, unlike some other vulture species, have not become fully dependent on feeding sites, though they do make use of them. Because of this, they have not been entirely successful at reducing lead toxicity, as birds tend to forage from contaminated carcasses in addition to the carcasses provided and there have been instances of accidental contamination of provisioned carcasses. Additionally, it was found that the presence of nearby vulture restaurants does not reduce the amount of trash foraged by condors and given to their chicks as food. Scheduled food provisioning at vulture restaurants may also alter natural ranging and parenting behaviors. Their more consistent success, however, has been in monitoring and caring for released individuals. Vulture restaurants provide a guaranteed social group for newly released vultures, and allow researchers easy access to check on populations and capture animals when needed, to change out GPS transmitters or perform veterinary care.

=== White-rumped vulture ===
Vulture restaurants are a common part of management strategies for the endangered white-rumped vulture. This species has undergone large declines along with other Asian vulture species as a result of toxicity from the livestock anti-inflammatory drug diclofenac, in addition to other causes. When monitored, vulture restaurants seem to decrease white-rumped vulture mortality though they do not eliminate it. White-rumped vulture populations have stabilized in some regions of Nepal that provision diclofenac-free carcasses from the community, but vultures large ranges allow for continued exposure to the drug in regions that do not restrict its use.

== Vulture restaurant ecotourism ==
Vulture restaurants have become the site of ecotourism activities. In many cases, tourists pay a fee to enter a viewing area and watch the vulture restaurants and observe the wildlife that gather there. This can have benefits for encouraging conservation, spreading awareness of threats to vultures, and reducing conflict between vultures and nearby human populations, but these operations face some criticisms as well. The practice of prioritizing tourist access to these locations may lead to inappropriate sites being used as restaurants, such as areas near powerlines where vultures may have collisions or areas close to human populations where vultures may interfere with livestock operations.

== Criticisms ==
In addition to the noted successes, vulture restaurants also face criticisms as a tool for vulture conservation. The restaurants themselves create unintended consequences such as increases in nuisance animals, like mammalian scavengers, in the area around the restaurant due to the consistent food supply. These nuisance animals may cause increased conflicts with humans and increased predation of nearby prey species such as small birds. The restaurants can also produce unpleasant odors and sites to which surrounding populations object. The uneaten or scattered bones and remains of the carrion put in the vulture restaurant can be accidentally ingested by neighboring livestock, and water can be contaminated due to the large concentration of decaying material in the area. In addition to these direct harms the restaurants may cause, some critics claim that vulture restaurants disturb natural processes. By creating designated areas for carcasses to be placed, rather than the random scattering of carcasses that would occur in nature, vulture restaurants risk destabilizing nutrient cycles and animal behavior patterns. These restaurants also bring vultures into closer association with humans, which may change their ecology and put them at greater risk for additional anthropogenic threats such as building and powerline collisions, retaliatory killings, and more. The restaurants also partially remove vultures from the trophic cycle of the area, potentially leading to increased disease from uneaten carcasses in other areas and augmenting parts of the food chain in an unsustainable way. Further, vulture restaurants are criticized for often failing to address the underlying causes of conservation threats to vultures. While providing non-contaminated food may reduce the likelihood of vultures consuming unsafe carcasses, it does not remove those dangers from the environment or prevent further contamination. Some practitioners accept this and say that vulture restaurants are a crucial temporary solution for populations in distress but that they cannot be the only management strategy in use.
