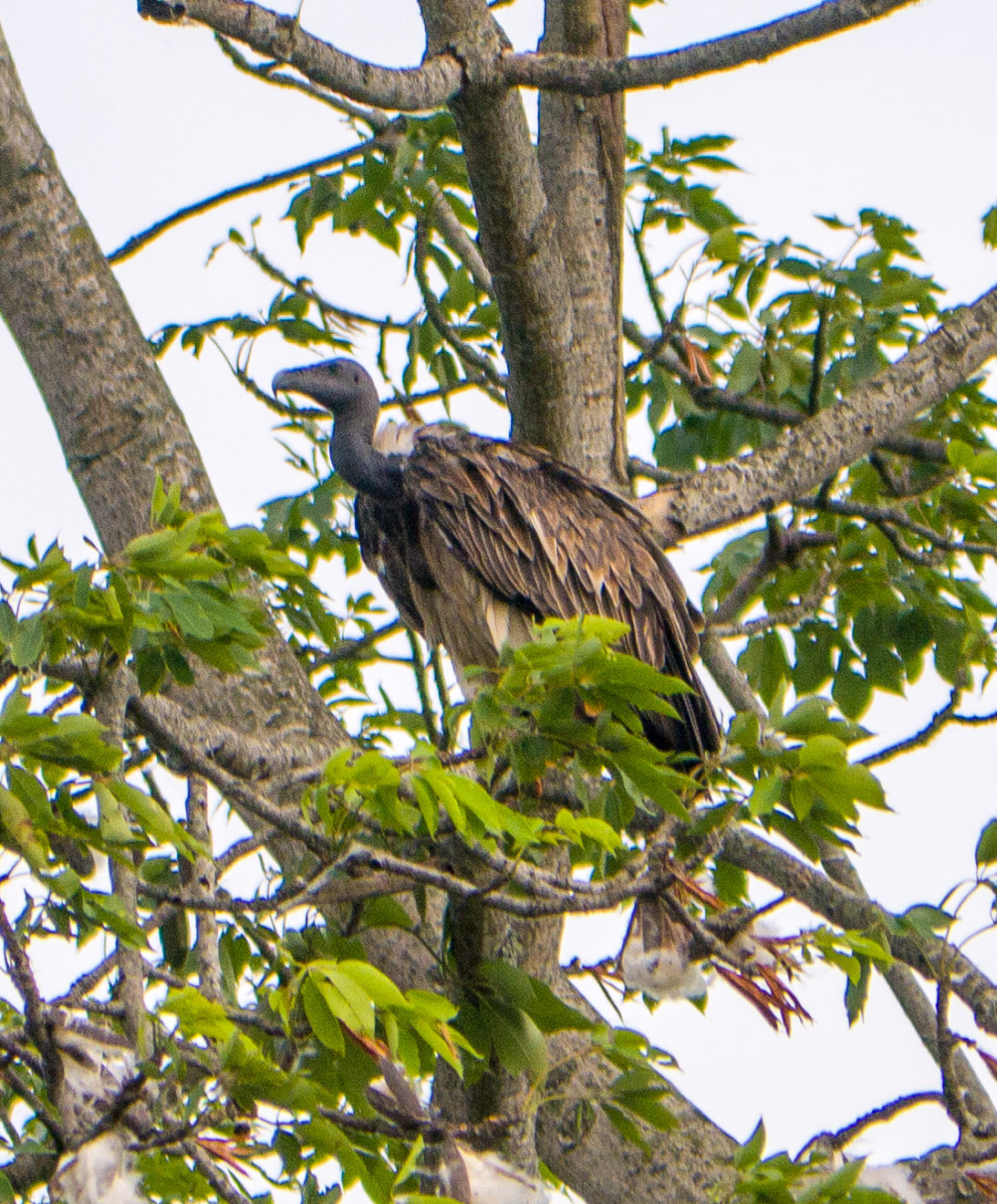
- Slender-billed Vulture in Arunachal Pradesh, India

Conservation status
- Critically Endangered (IUCN 3.1)

Scientific classification
- Kingdom: Animalia
- Phylum: Chordata
- Class: Aves
- Order: Accipitriformes
- Family: Accipitridae
- Genus: Gyps
- Species: G. tenuirostris

Binomial name
- Gyps tenuirostris Gray, GR, 1844
- Distribution in blue

Synonyms
- Gyps indicus tenuirostris Gyps indicus nudiceps

= Slender-billed vulture =

Species of bird

The slender-billed vulture (Gyps tenuirostris) is an Old World vulture species native to sub-Himalayan regions and Southeast Asia. It is Critically Endangered since 2002 as the population on the Indian subcontinent has declined rapidly. As of 2021, fewer than 870 mature individuals are thought to remain.

It used to be the Indian vulture, under the name of "long-billed vulture". However, these two species have non-overlapping distribution ranges and can be immediately told apart by trained observers, even at considerable distances. The Indian vulture is found only to the south of the Ganges and breeds on cliffs while the slender-billed vulture is found along and nests in trees.

== Description ==
At 80 to 95 cm (31 to 37 in), in length, this mid-sized vulture is about the same size as its sister species, the Indian vulture. The wingspan of the vulture ranges from 196 to 258 cm (77 to 102 in). The slender-billed vulture is commonly mistaken for the Indian vulture, but there are a few key differences that differentiate the two species, primarily its darker head, and bill that is thinner than its sister species. This vulture is mostly grey with a pale rump and grey under-tail coverts. The thighs have whitish down. The neck is long, bare, skinnier than the Indian vulture and black. The black head is angular and narrow and its dark bill appears narrow midway, which also has a light spot on the culmen. The ear opening is prominent and exposed, and the head and neck are very wrinkled in contrast to its sister species.

Juvenile slender-billed vultures are extremely similar to adults save for the white down on the back base of its neck, which it loses as it matures. Vultures do not show signs of sexual dimorphism, which is when the males and females of the species vary in appearance to each other, and the slender-billed vulture is no different.

== Distribution and habitat ==
The slender-billed vulture is found in India from the Gangetic plain north, west to Himachal Pradesh, south potentially as far as northern Odisha, and east through Assam. It is also found in north and central Bangladesh, southern Nepal, Burma and Cambodia. It also nests in trees, unlike its sister species the Indian vulture which nests on cliff sides. Commonly found in areas that have slaughterhouses and small civilizations.

Slender-billed vultures in the eastern range of these areas are also highly fragmented from each other. They typically are sedentary birds, and do not tend to travel large distances nor migrate for any reason. On occasion, slender-billed vultures will travel distances when scavenging for food, and have been recorded as well traversing past the borders of neighboring countries such as Laos, Cambodia and Vietnam. These records of movement have also decreased with the declining population.

== Ecology and behavior ==
=== Breeding ===
The breeding season of this species occurs between the autumn and winter months of October and March, where a pair will build a large nest made of large, compact sticks high off of the ground where it is built into the branches of large trees. Typical breeding trees for this species tend to be quite large, ranging from 7 to 25 meters. These vultures are solitary nesters, which means that will not nest in close proximity with any other nests. Once the pair and nest is established, slender-billed vultures almost exclusively lay one egg for each clutch, which takes around a month and a half (50 days) to incubate.

=== Feeding ===
The slender-billed vulture, like many vultures, feeds on carrion, or carcasses of dead mammals. This primarily consists of cattle and other kinds of livestock as well as the occasional human carcass. Beyond any preexisting carrion that it can find, these vultures will also scavenge for scraps in dumpsters and dump sites. They also appear to be quite social with other vultures, and has been spotted feeding in large groups also consisting of white-rumped vulture (Gyps bengalensis), and red-headed vultures (Sarcogyps calvus).

== Status and conservation ==
This species has suffered a marked decline in its numbers in recent years. The population of this species and the Indian vulture declined by 97% overall and in India annual decline rates for both species averaged over 16% between 2000–2007. As the slender-billed vulture has also recently been identified as its own species, there is a struggle to correctly identify the correct vulture to include in the recorded counts of the species. Wild populations remain from northern and eastern India through southern Nepal and Bangladesh, with a small population in Burma. The only breeding colony in Southeast Asia is in the Steung Treng province of Cambodia. This colony is thought to number about 50–100 birds. The survival of the vultures in Cambodia may have been partly because diclofenac, which is poisonous to vultures, is not available there. The Royal Society for the Protection of Birds (RSPB) has placed the approximate number of slender-billed vultures living beyond confines at about 1,000 in 2009 and predictions estimate total extinction within the next decade amongst the wild population.

The slender-billed vulture is a protected species listed on the appendix II list of CITES, because its numbers have declined rapidly. Its decline is largely due to the use of the non-steroidal anti-inflammatory drug (NSAID) diclofenac in working farm animals. Diclofenac is poisonous to vultures, causing kidney failure, and is being replaced by meloxicam (another NSAID), which is not toxic to vultures. The retail sale of Diclofenac is banned by law in India; however, Diclofenac is still acquired illegally and applied to livestock. In an effort to combat this, India has also limited the version of the drug for humans being sold in vials any larger than 3 mL in an attempt to discourage its illegal use on livestock, which would need a significantly higher dosage to show results. However, it appears that there has been no evidence of Diclofenac in Cambodia, which has placed an emphasis on the preservation of the small population that still exists there, as they are less likely to have issues with breeding due to the presence of the drug.

Captive-breeding programs in India are aiming to conserve the species, and it is hoped that vultures can be released back in the wild when the environment is free of diclofenac. Joint efforts between the RSPB and the Zoological Society of London resulted in the first successful captive breeding in 2009. Two slender-billed vultures hatched and are being independently cared for in Haryana and West Bengal.

Another form of conservation was the establishment of sites known as "vulture restaurants". The purpose of these places were to have a place to supply local vulture populations with guaranteed safe carcasses for them to eat. These carcasses were typically supplied by farms that were confirmed not to have used Diclofenac on their animals. These vulture restaurants were also instated in areas with generally little food sources or nutrient poor food sources in an effort to provide the meager vulture populations with food. As of 2017, a total of 51 slender-billed vultures had been spotted at various vulture restaurants.

The group SAVE (Saving Asia's Vultures from Extinction) has also begun in the past decade an effort to create a multitude of "Vulture Safe Zones", which are heavily protected areas that have at least a 100 km radius that aim to be created around crucial breeding populations of the species. The goal is to create a safe place for the vultures to reproduce again as well as achieving outreach to public and governmental groups. After breeding in captivity, the hope is that these zones would create a safe and stable environment to release the species into. As of 2014, there were 12 of these Vulture Safe Zones currently in the process of being established.
