= Jutpani =

Kalika Municipality कालिका
- Location in Nepal
- Coordinates: 27.70°N 84.52°E
- Country: Nepal
- Province: Bagmati Province
- District: Chitwan District

Population (1991)
  - Total: 8,762
- Time zone: UTC+5:45 (Nepal Time)

Jutpani is a village development committee in Chitwan District in Bagmati Province of southern Nepal. At the time of the 1991 Nepal census it had a population of 8,762 people living in 1,714 individual households.

== Geography ==
- East: Pithuwa VDC and Shaktikhor VDC
- West: Bharatpur Municipality
- North: Padampur VDC
- South: Ratnanagar Municipality

== Education ==
- Private schools
  - New Sagarmatha Secondary School, Jutpani-3 (Jutpani Bazzar)
  - Moon Light Boarding School, Jutpani-1(Shanti Chowk)
  - Siddhi Vinayak Boarding School Jutpani-1 (Kholesimal Bazzar)
  - Janapriya Lower Secondary School, Jutpani-4
- State schools
  - Prithivi Higher Secondary School Jutpani-4
  - Jamunapur Ka Lower Secondary School, Jutpani-5
  - Sivalaya Primary School, Jutpani-4
  - Redcross Primary School, Jutpani-4
  - Rastriya Primary School, Jutpani-3 (Jutpani Bazzar)

== Major places ==
- Gaidakhola Tole
- Jutpani Bazzar
- Kholesimal Bazzar
- Kalika Temple
- Shanti Nikunja
- Sivalaya Temple, Gurauchour
- Jamunapur
- Bhateni/Prithivi Chowk
- Padampur
