= Edward Pritchard Gee =

British naturalist

- Born: 1904; County Durham, United Kingdom
- Died: 1968 (aged 63–64)
- Education: Durham School and Emmanuel College, Cambridge
- Occupation: Tea planter
- Known for: discovery of Gee's golden langur, promoting creation of Chitwan National Park

Notes
- Gee was described as: "a fairly built heavy man, balding and wears tortoise shell glasses. He repeats everything twice over, the second phrase tumbling out after the first."

Edward Pritchard Gee (1904–1968) was a Cambridge educated, Anglo-Indian tea-planter and an amateur naturalist in Assam, India. He is credited with the 1953 discovery of Gee's golden langur. He is notable as an early influential wildlife conservationist, especially for his 1959 and 1963 surveys and recommendations resulting in the creation of Chitwan National Park, the first of nine national parks in Nepal.

== Conservationist ==
Gee was the fourth son of Rev. C. G. Gee, Vicar of Lowick and his wife, daughter of a Colonel Briggs of Hylton Castle. As a tea planter, Gee was part of a highly influential group of British landowners very close to the highest levels of provincial power. Soon after India's Independence, Gee was one of the first to assess the threats to endangered species and outline conservation measures to protect them. He believed cattle had no place in a sanctuary and thought they would arouse a sense of surprise, disappointment, and revulsion in tourists who had come looking for wild animals.

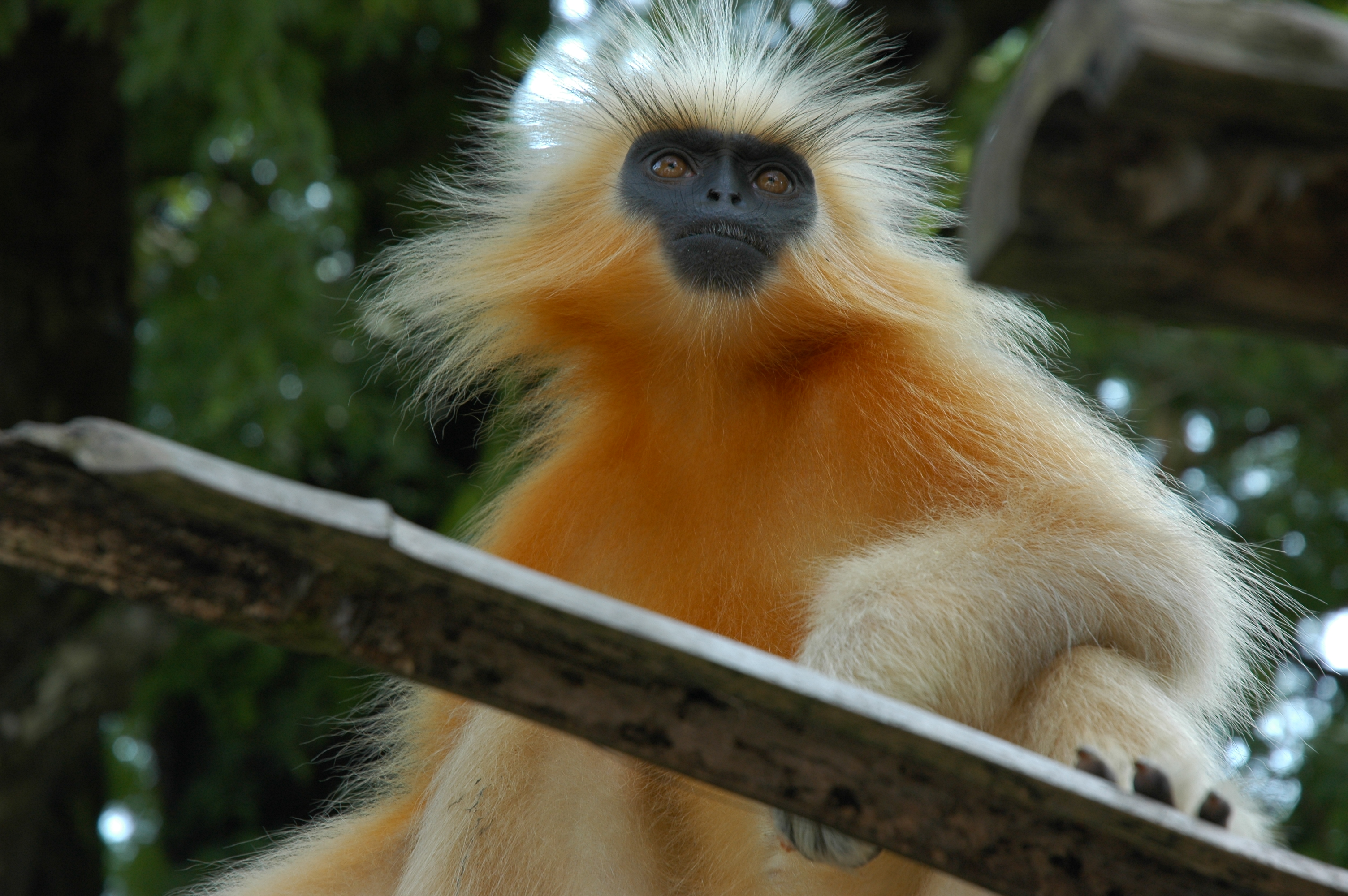
Gee's golden langur named for E.P. Gee

Like his contemporaries, Salim Ali and M. Krishnan, Gee was a non-official member of the Indian Board for Wildlife, the apex body that advises the Union Government on wildlife matters. Gee argued in favour of separate wildlife wardens within the Forest Department, who have specific powers in relation to fauna. He wrote extensively on the role of foresters as protectors of wildlife, as he thought it important to rely on their goodwill. He believed conservation success depended on cooperation between foresters and the forest ministers of each state and that the role of the central government was only to advise and assist.

He is famous for his discovery of the langur species which is named after him, Gee's golden langur. He had heard reports of an unusual coloured primate and he organised an expedition in 1953. He managed to film the langurs near the Sankosh River on the border between Assam and Bhutan.

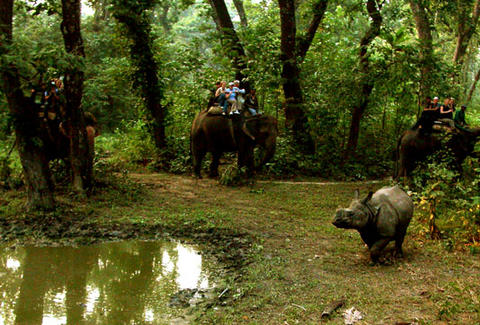
Elephant safari in Chitwan National Park

He recommended that the Govindgarh Palace of the Maharaja of Rewa, and its white tiger inhabitants, be made a "National Trust", which didn't happen.

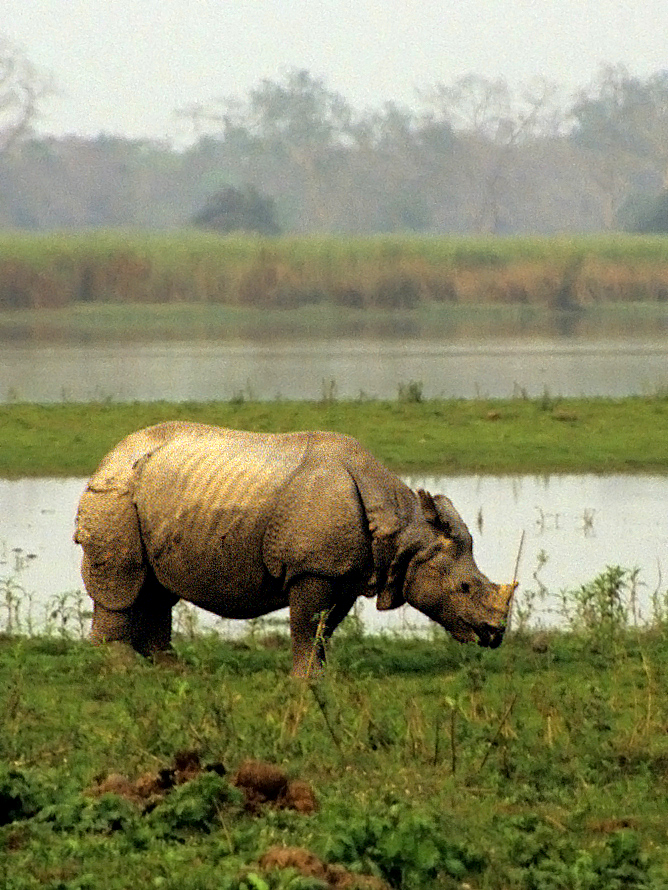
Great Indian one-horned rhinoceros at Kaziranga National Park

In 1959, the Fauna Preservation Society appointed E.P. Gee to undertake a survey of the Chitwan Valley. Gee, who had spent most of his life in India and was an authority on its wildlife, recommended creation of a national park north of the Rapti River. He also proposed creation of a wildlife sanctuary south of the river for a trial period of ten years. In 1963, after he surveyed Chitwan again, this time for both the Fauna Preservation Society and the International Union for Conservation of Nature, Gee recommended extension of the national park to rhinoceros areas to the south of the river. In December 1970, His Majesty King Mahendra approved extension of the national park as recommended, thus creating the first national park in Nepal.

After retirement from tea planting in Assam, Gee settled in Shillong, where he assembled one of the finest private orchid collections. After Independence, sensitive to the nationalism of the new Indian leadership, Gee searched for and emphasized indigenous nature conservation practices, ranging from ancient imperial edicts to village traditions of protecting nesting bird colonies. This cooperative and culturally sensitive style won recognition from Jawaharlal Nehru whom Gee accompanied together with Nehru's daughter Indira Gandhi and son-in-law Feroze Gandhi on a tour of Kaziranga Wildlife Sanctuary on 20 October 1956. Nehru's forward to Gee's book in February 1964 was one of the only pieces he ever wrote on wildlife conservation. In it he said,

Life would become very dull and colourless if it did not have these magnificent animals and birds to look at and to play with.

Nehru called for more refuges for vanishing wildlife, but he died in May and Gee died four years later.

== Publications ==
The Wild Life of India, 1964 first edition

- E.P. Gee was an active contributor to the early wildlife protection policy of India. He wrote his own account of his wildlife work in the book The Wild Life of India in 1964. This work makes a good comparison with present-day wildlife conservation efforts in India.

The Indian Minister of State (Independent Charge) for Environment and Forests since May 2009, Jairam Ramesh's acquaintance with the natural world began when he was nine (1963) and was gifted The Wild Life of India. The book is a classic with a beautiful foreword by Jawaharlal Nehru that has stayed with him all these years.

The Wild Life of India was first published in hard cover 224-page, 8 b/w and 12 colour plates illustrated edition, weight 645 grams by William Collins, Sons and Co Ltd in London in July 1964 (Second hardback edition. green cloth. 192pp; 12 colour plates 64 b/w plates.) and E.P. Dutton & Co. 6 1/8" x 9", Green hardback with gold print on black background on spine, 192 pages, 8vo. Illus. with 8 b/w and 12 colour plates) in New York in December 1964. Third impression in March 1965 had 192 pages with 12 colour and over 60 b/w illustrations. The book was republished by Fontana paperbacks in London in 1969 and again in 177-page version on 1 May 1992 by Indus, South Asia Books. It was reprinted by Harper Collins in New Delhi in 2000.

Book review by India Club says,

"The Wildlife of India, 2000 edition

For anyone interested in wildlife or the natural resources of India this is an enthralling and informative book. For the animals themselves it may make all the difference between extermination and survival. Some of the noblest and most beautiful animals in the world are to be found in India. But they are unlikely to survive outside the pages of Kipling and the memoirs of big-game hunters unless something is done quickly to save them. E P Gee has spent half a lifetime studying and photographing animals and birds in India. He has sat in the open within ten feet of a lion, has fallen in front of a charging rhinoceros and he has a strange tale to tell of a bird mystery in Assam; but although it is full of good stories this is not a book of daring deeds. It is a unique panorama of the wildlife resources of India, her sanctuaries, the animals which inhabit them and the men who have done most to preserve them.

COMMENTS: Absolutely splendid. The photographs and text are of a very high quality. – Peter Scott – The author's great experience of Indian wildlife and his superb photography render this one of the most enthralling books on natural history. All interested in nature will find it hard to stop reading. – The Naturalist – A plea for the preservation of wild animals and birds in India. Mr. Gee a splendid raconteur, takes each of the main species and discusses with a wealth of anecdotes its chances of survival. A dedicated man, he is no fanatic. Of outstanding interest.

Some of his other publications are

- "The White Tiger" in Animal, 1964, vol. 3, pages. 282–286.
- "The breeding of the Grey or Spottedbilled Pelican Pelecanus philippensis (Gmelin)". Journal of the Bombay Natural History Society, Vol.57, 1960, issue 2, pages 245–251.
- "Albinism And Partial Albinism In Tiger", Journal of the Bombay Natural History Society, 1959, Vol. 56, pages. 581–587.
- "History of the Rhino Area in Nepal" in the journal Cheetal, Vol 4, 1961, pp. 16–28
- "Note on the Indo-Burmese Pied Hornbill", Journal of the Bombay Natural History Society, Vol. 36 (1933) pp. 505–506
- "Fishing and Fish Tackle", IF, Vol. 82, 1954, pp. 423–426
- "The Management of India's Wildlife Sanctuaries and National Parks, Part II", Journal of the Bombay Natural History Society, Vol. 52, 1954, pp. 717–731

Other articles written by E. P. Gee, published in Journal of the Bombay Natural History Society

- A leopard cat (Felis bengalensis Kerr) in captivity 59(2), PLATES – 1
- A new species of langur in Assam 53(2)
- A note on the conference on conservation of nature and natural resources in tropical South-East Asia held at Bangkok, Thailand. 29 November – 4 December 1965 63(1), PLATES – 1
- A note on the occurrence of the Malayan sun bear Helarctos malayanus (Raffles) within Indian limits 64(2), PLATES – 1
- A possible cause of blank days when Mahseer fishing 48(3)
- Bharatpur 'wild' cattle 55(2), PLATES – 1
- Black leopard cubs 48(1)
- Effect of atmospheric pressure while fishing 49(1)
- Effect of atmospheric pressure while fishing 49(4)
- Extermination of snakes upsets balance of nature 51(1)
- Further observations on the great Indian one-horned rhinoceros (R. unicornis Linn.) 51(4), PLATES – 1 2
- Great Indian one-horned rhinoceros (R. unicornis Linn.) cow with (presumptive) twin calves 53(2)
- Lion v. tiger 54(1)
- Mystery predator 51(3)
- Note on the development of the casque of the Indo-Burmese pied hornbill (Anthracoceros albirostris) 36(3), PLATES – 1
- Occurrence of the brown bear, Ursus arctos (Linnaeus), in Bhutan 64(3)
- Occurrence of the nayan or great Tibetan sheep, Ovis ammon hodgsoni (Blyth) in Bhutan 64(3)
- Occurrence of the snow leopard, Panthera uncia (Schreber), in Bhutan 64(3)
- On the leopard cat. (Prionailurus bengalensis) 47(2)
- Possible occurrence of the snub-nosed monkey (Rhinopithecus roxellanae) in Assam 51(1)
- Predator and prey at salt-licks 54(1)
- Report on the status of the brow-antlered deer, Cervus eldi (MacClelland) of Manipur (India) – October–November 1959 and March 1960 57(3), PLATES – 1 2 3 4
- Report on the status of the Kashmir stag- October 1965 62(3), PLATES – 1 2 3 4 5
- Some notes on the golden cat, Felis temmincki Vigors & Horsfield 58(2)
- Strange behaviour of a tigress 39(3)
- The Assam earthquake of 1950 50(3), PLATES – 1 2 3
- The brow-antlered deer (Cervus eldi MacClelland) 52(4), PLATES – 1
- The Distribution and Feeding Habits of the Golden Langur, Presbytis geei, Gee (Khajuria, 1956) 58(1), PLATES – 1 2 3
- The function of zoological gardens in the preservation of wild life 53(1), PLATES – 1 2 3 4
- The great Indian rhinoceros (R. unicornis) in Nepal-Report of a fact-finding survey, April–May 1959 56(3), PLATES – 1 2 3 4 5 6
- The Indian elephant, (E. maximus)- Early growth gradient and intervals between calving 53(1), PLATES – 1 2 3 4
- The Indian Wild Ass- A survey-February 1962 60(3), PLATES – 1
- The life history of the great Indian one-horned rhinoceros (R. unicornis Linn.) 51(2), PLATES – 1
- The management of India's wild life sanctuaries and national parks 51(1), PLATES – 1 2 3 4
- The management of India's wild life sanctuaries and national parks. Part II 52(4), PLATES – 1 2 3 4 5 6
- The management of India's wild life sanctuaries and national parks. Part III 54(1), PLATES – 1 2 3 4 5 6
- The management of India's wild life sanctuaries and national parks. Part IV 59(2), PLATES – 1 2
- The management of India's wild life sanctuaries and national parks. Part V 64(2)
- The present status of the whitewinged wood duck, Cairina scutulata (S. Muller) 55(3), PLATES – 1
- The shou or 'Sikkim stag' 55(3), PLATES – 1
- The size of the jungle cat (Felis chaus affinis) 39(4)
- The wildfowl trust at Slimbridge in Britain 58(2), PLATES – 1 2
- What is the best means of control and destruction of flying foxes (Pteropus giganteus) (Brunn.) 50(2)
- What is the best means of control and destruction of flying foxes (Pteropus giganteus) (Brunn)? 51(1)
- Wild buffaloes and tame 51(3)
- Wild elephants dying in Assam 49(1)
- Wild elephants dying in Assam 49(2)
- Wild life Preservation in India. 52(2)
- Wild life reserves in India- Assam 49(1), PLATES – 1 2 3
