= Inner Terai Valleys of Nepal =

River valleys in Nepal

The Inner Terai Valleys of Nepal comprise several elongated river valleys in the southern lowland Terai part of the country. These tropical valleys are enclosed by the Himalayan foothills, viz the Mahabharat Range and the Sivalik Hills farther south.

These valleys are part of the Terai-Duar savanna and grasslands ecoregion. They are filled up with coarse to fine alluvial sediments. The Chitwan Valley and the Dang and Deukhuri Valleys are some of the largest Inner Terai Valleys. Malaria was prevalent in this region until the late 1950s. Since its eradication, the area became a viable destination for large-scale migration of people from the hills who transformed the area from virgin forest and grassland to farmland.

== Geology ==
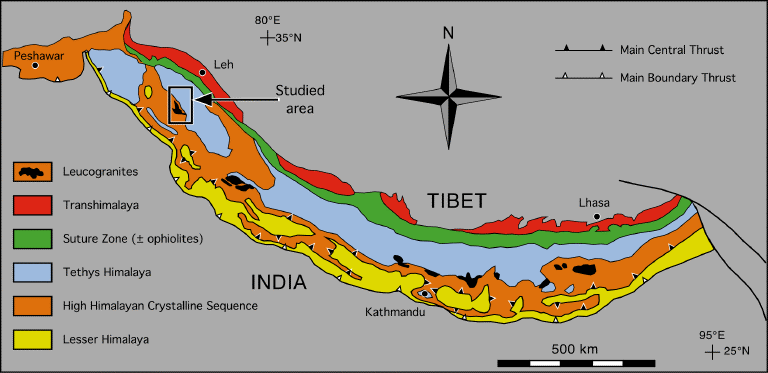
Geologic – Tectonic map of the Himalaya, modified after Le Fort (1988)

The Inner Terai valleys lie between the Sivalik Hills and Mahabharat Range. They hold flat plains with winding rivers that shift their courses from time to time, running northwest or southeast along the axis of the Sivalik Hills.

== Climate ==
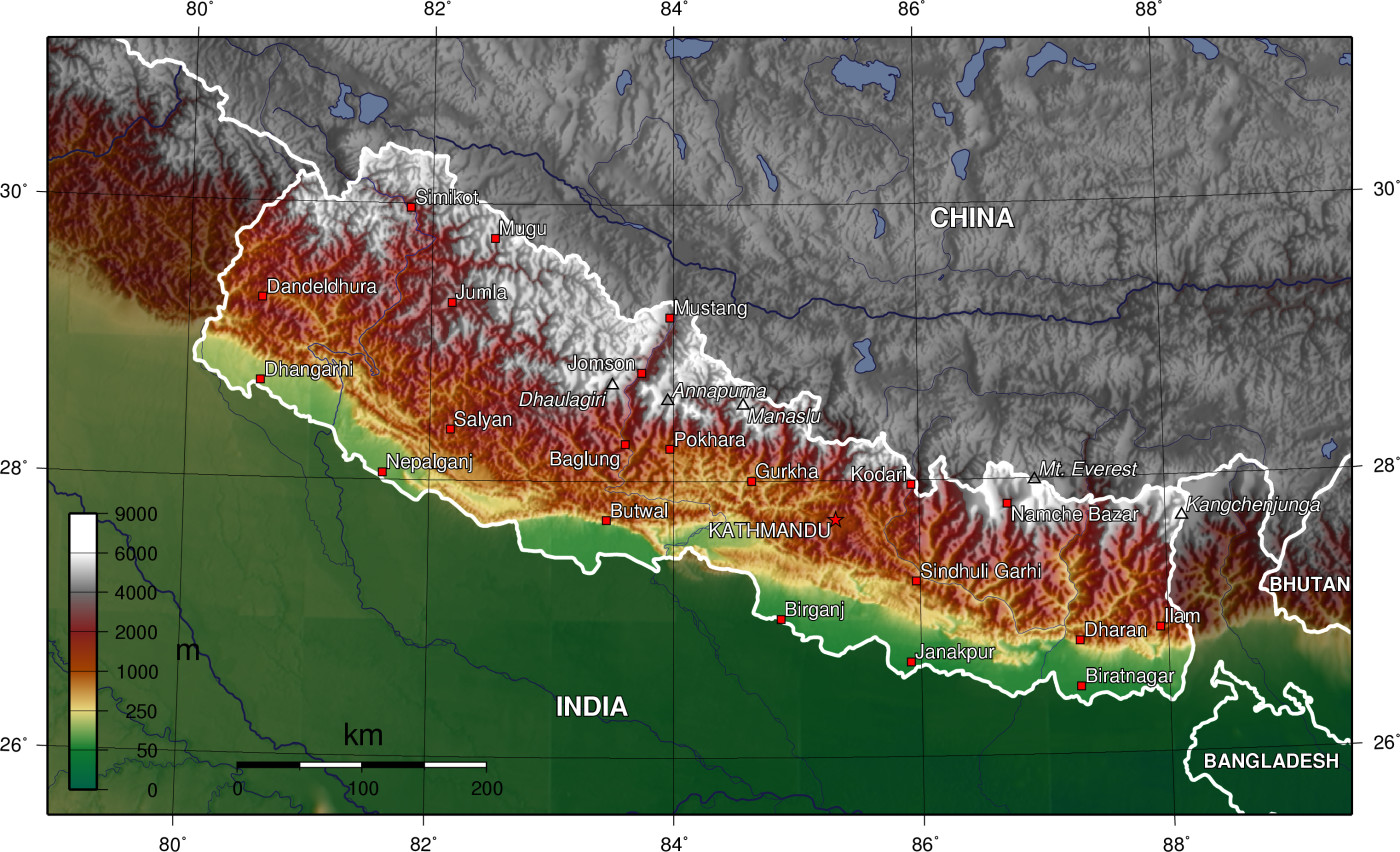
Nepal topography. The green/yellow zones hold the Inner Terai valleys.

The Terai has a humid, subtropical climate. The mean annual rainfall at the Rampur weatherstation in Chitwan was 2,214 mm (87.2 in) between 1995 and 2006. More than 80% of the total annual rainfall occurs during the monsoon season from June to September. Average temperatures ranged from 8.08 °C (46.54 °F) in January to 34.91 °C (94.84 °F) in June.

In the past, the inner and outer Terai were a formidable barrier between Nepal and potential invaders from India because marshes and forests were infested by anopheline mosquitos that transmitted virulent strains of malaria, especially during the hot spring and rainy summer monsoon.

== History ==
Until the mid 18th century, the Terai was divided into several smaller kingdoms, and the forests were little disturbed. After the unification of Nepal in the late 1760s, the rulers granted large areas of fertiIe land and forest resources to members of the royal family, officials, priests and selected groups of the society. The beneficiaries of these grants had the right to collect revenues from cultivated land and forest products. They appointed tax collectors who were also responsible for reclamation of land and establishment of settlements. In the late 1920s, the Rana rulers ordered the clearing of forests and extraction of timber for export to India in order to collect revenues. Cleared areas were subsequently used for agriculture.

Tharu people have been living in the Terai for many centuries, and reputedly had an innate resistance to malaria. After malaria was eradicated using DDT in the mid-1950s, people from the hills migrated to the Terai. Timber export continued to 1969. In 1970, the king granted land to loyal ex-army personnel in the districts of Jhapa, Sunsari, Rupandehi and Banke, where seven colonies were developed for resettling about 7,000 people. They acquired property rights over uncultivated forest and waste land, thus accelerating the deforestation process in the Terai.

== Environmental issues ==
The well-meaning malaria eradication campaign has had unexpected consequences by opening up the Terai region to human settlement. The Inner Terai valleys are home to a rich and diverse ecosystem. Since the early 1990s, however, the forests have been increasingly destroyed because of growing demands for timber and agricultural land. This has led to concerns about the risk of losing many rare plants.

The valleys also mitigate the severity of floods on the Gangetic plains. During heavy rainfall forests absorb water. During floods, rivers overflow their banks and flood adjacent forests. Later the forests gradually release water back into the rivers. Deforestation reduces this buffering effect. It also accelerates soil erosion, causing downstream rivers to silt up and overflow their banks. The frequency and severity of flooding in the Gangetic plain and Bangladesh has steadily increased in recent years. Deforestation of the Terai appears to be one of the major causes. The Indian and Nepalese governments are cooperating in measures including construction of barrages and dams in the Terai, such as the Koshi Barrage. However, these efforts may have mixed results. They contain floodwater in the short term, but may increase the problem in the longer term by reducing water velocity in the rivers downstream, and thus accelerating silting and reducing the drainage capacity of the rivers.

== Valleys ==
The major Inner Terai Valleys are listed from west to east. Click on the terrain and satellite imagery links to see vegetation, rivers, topography, roads and towns.

=== Western Terai ===
Markers at valleys Jogbudha (J), Surkhet (S), Dang (A) and Deukhuri (E) terrain satellite

==== Surkhet Valley ====
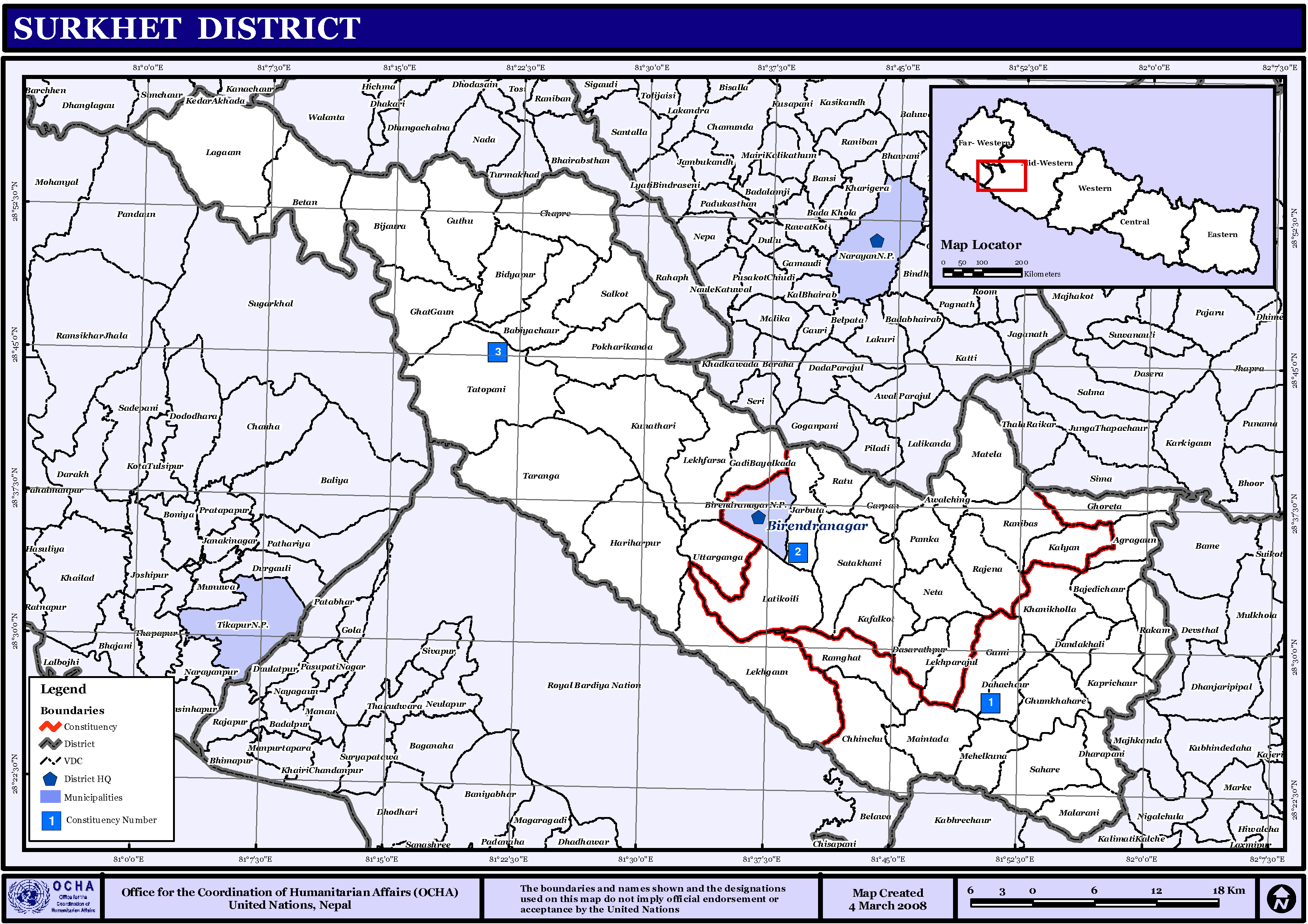
Map of the VDCs in Surkhet District

The Surkhet Valley is situated in the Surkhet district, mid-western Nepal. The valley is about 700 m (2,300 ft) above sea level, forming an ellipse about 9 km (5.6 mi) east-west by 6 km (3.7 mi) north-south. It is drained by the Bheri River, a tributary of the Karnali. The district is the homeland of the Raji people. Tharu people from Dang settled in the valley since at least the 19th century.

Imagery of Surkhet (S): terrain satellite

==== Dang and Deukhuri Valleys ====
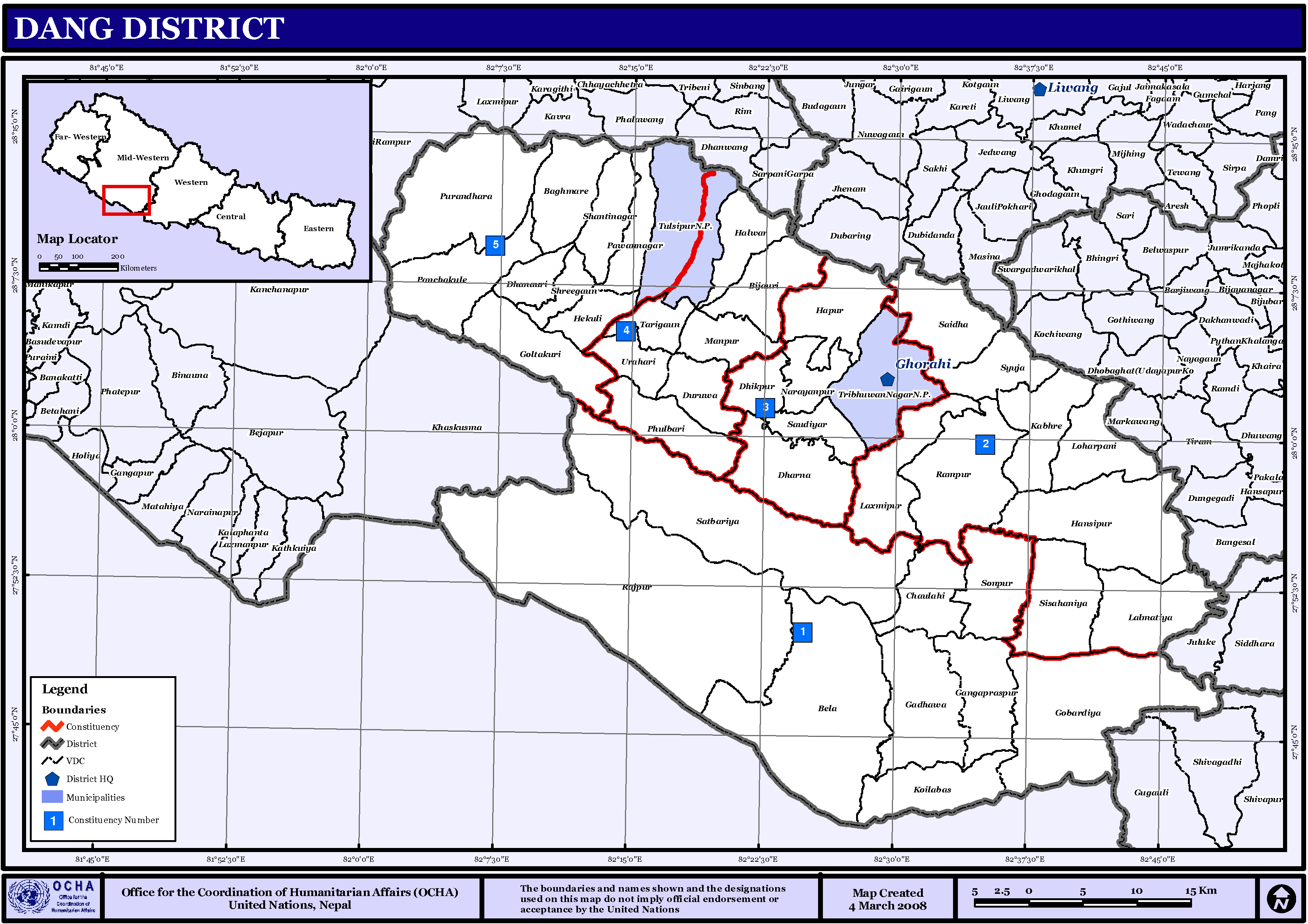
Map of the settlements in Dang-Deukhuri District

Both valleys are located in the Dang Deukhuri District of the Rapti Zone in mid-western Nepal. The Dang Valley lies between the Mahabharat Range in the north and the Churia Range in the south. It forms a nearly 1,000 km^{2} (390 sq mi) plain within a local drainage basin of less than 3,000 km^{2} (1,200 sq mi). It is drained by the Babai River, and is one of the largest Inner Terai valleys.

The Deukhuri Valley is southeast of the Dang Valley and extends about 60 km (37 mi) in WNW-ESE direction with a maximum width of 20 km (12 mi). It forms a nearly 600 km^{2} (230 sq mi) plain within a drainage basin of 6,100 km^{2} (2,400 sq mi). The valley is drained by the West Rapti River.

The Mahendra Highway passes through the Deukhuri Valley. Both valleys are settled by Tharu people.

Imagery of Dang (A) and Deukhuri (E): terrain satellite

=== Central Terai ===
==== Chitwan Valley ====
The Chitwan Valley, the biggest valley in Nepal, encompasses the districts of Makwanpur, Chitwan and Nawalpur of central Nepal. The Chitwan Valley lies south-west of the Kathmandu valley and it has 600 square miles in area. After the re-structuring of the country in 2015, two districts of this valley, namely, Makwanpur and Chitwan lies in Bagmati Province and Nawalpur district lies in Gandaki Province. It is 150 km (93 mi) long and roughly 30–48 km (19–30 mi) wide. The cities of Bharatpur, Ratnanagar, Hetauda and Kawasoti are in the valley. It is drained by the Rapti River flowing from the Mahabharat Range near Hetauda, then west down the valley to join the bigger Narayani River west of Meghauli situated within the valley.

Imagery of Chitwan (C): terrain satellite

The Chitwan National Park, Nepal's first national park established in 1973, was declared a World Heritage site by UNESCO in 1984. It contains the largest and least disturbed natural Sal hill forest and associated communities. Its fauna comprises Bengal tiger, Indian leopard, great one-horned rhinos, wild Asian elephant, gaur, golden monitor lizard, gharial and marsh crocodile.

=== Eastern Terai ===
==== Udayapur Valley ====
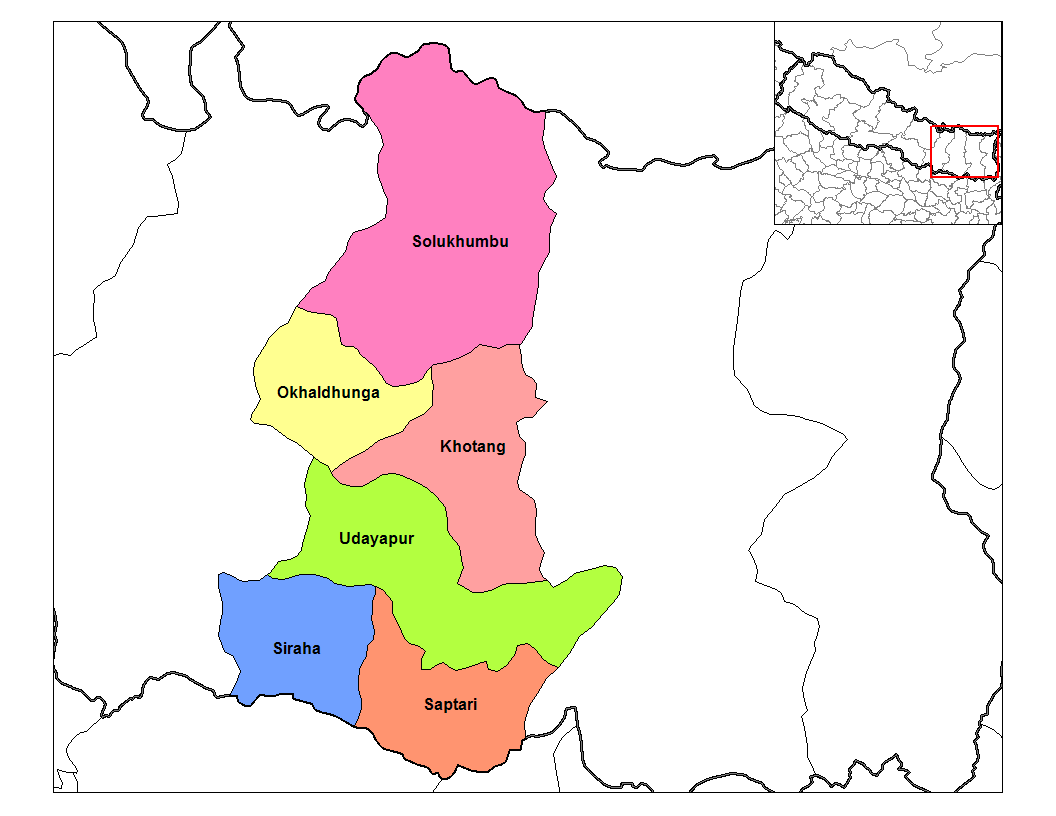
Sagarmatha zone: Udayapur district in green

The Udayapur Valley, is in Udayapur district in southeastern Nepal. It is about 30 km (19 mi) long and between 2 km (1.2 mi) and 4 km (2.5 mi) wide. It is drained by the Triyuga river flowing east to join the great Koshi River. This valley lies between the Mahabharat Range to the north and the Sivalik Hills to the south, with an average elevation of about 430 m (1,410 ft).

The mouth of the valley opens onto a 175 km (109 mi) rectangle of land where the Triyuga meets the Koshi river above the Koshi Barrage. It was designated the Koshi Tappu Wildlife Reserve in 1976, and is home to the last remaining population of wild Asian water buffalo in Nepal. The reserve is mostly wetlands, subject to seasonal flooding, but also includes some grasslands and small patches of riverine forest. It is a Ramsar Site.
