= Valleys of Nepal =

Map of Nepal

The valleys of Nepal (Nepali: नेपालका उपत्यकाहरू) are situated in three physiographic regions: Terai, Hilly, and Himal. As Nepal is landlocked by India on three sides and China's Tibet Autonomous Region to the north, much of its population is concentrated in valleys and lowlands.

== List ==
=== A ===
- Arun Valley

=== B ===
- Barun Valley

=== C ===
- Chitwan Valley

=== D ===
- Dang Valley {Inner Terai Valleys of Nepal}
- Dho Valley
- Deukhuri Valley

=== I ===
- Inner Terai Valleys of Nepal

=== J ===
Jogbudha Valley

=== K ===
- Kamala Valley
- Kathmandu Valley
- Khaptad Valley
- Khumbu Valley

=== L ===
- Langtang Valley
- Limi Valley

=== M ===
- Manang Valley

=== N ===
- Namche Valley

=== P ===
- Pokhara Valley
- Pyuthan Valley
- Poon Valley
- Panchkhal Valley

=== S ===
- Sinja Valley
- Surkhet Valley

=== R ===
- Ripuk Valley
- Rolwaling Valley

=== T ===
- Tsum Valley

== Panchkhal Valley ==
Panchkhal Valley is located in Bagmati Province, Kavrepalanchok District of Nepal.

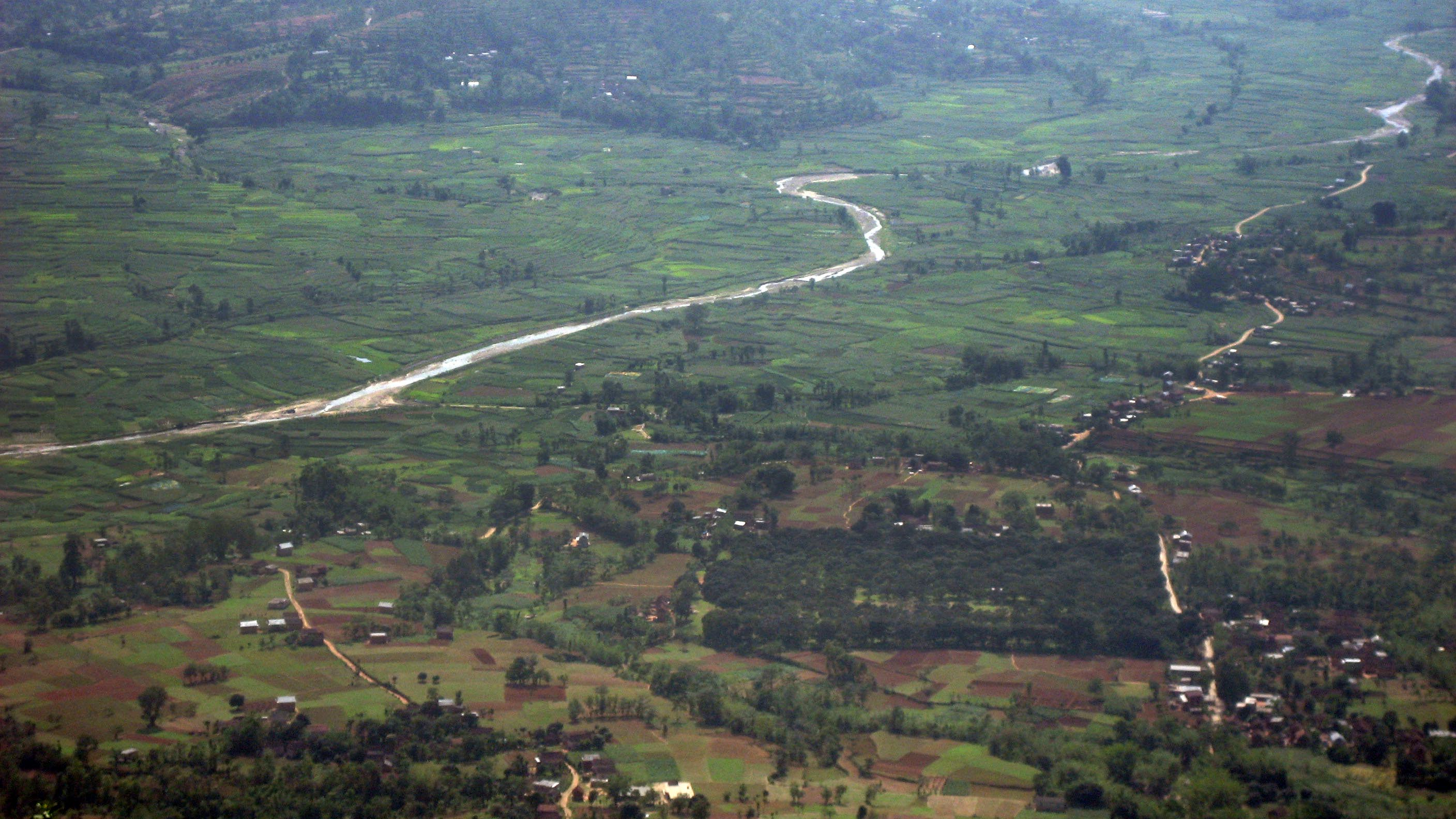
Panchkhal Valley as seen from Palanchok Bhagawati Temple

=== Geographic Location ===
- About 35 km east of Kathmandu Valley.
- Elevation ranges from 850 m to 1,100 m above sea level.
- Major settlements include Panchkhal Municipality, Tamaghat, and areas near Dhulikhel.

=== Features ===
- Fertile agricultural land: The valley is famous for rice, vegetables, and fruit production.
- Irrigation system: Traditional irrigation practices are still in use.
- Historical importance: In the past, it was called the “granary of rice”.
- Natural beauty: Offers views of Ganesh Himal, Langtang, Gosaikunda, and other Himalayan ranges.

=== Tourism Attractions ===
- Homestay tourism in local villages.
    - Agro-tourism (rice planting, harvesting, and traditional farming experiences).

== See also ==
- Geography of Nepal
