= Suryapur =

Coordinates: 27°41′N 84°31′E

Suryapur सूर्यपुर
- Village
- Interactive map of Suryapur
- Country: Nepal
- Province: Province No. 1
- District: Chitwan District
- Time zone: UTC+5:45 (Nepal Time)

Suryapur is a village in the Jutpani Village development committee of the Chitwan District in Nepal. (Not to be confused with Suryapur in Gujarat state, also called Surat.)
