= Monster and Me =

Children's book series by Cort Lane

- Author: Cort Lane
- Illustrator: Ankitha Kini
- Country: United States
- Language: English
- Publisher: Little Bee Books

Monster and Me is a series of children’s chapter books written by Cort Lane and illustrated by Anitha Kini. The book series focuses on Freddy von Frankenstein; his monster big brother, F.M. (also known as Frankenstein’s Monster); and his adopted sister, a werecat named Riya, as they explore the supernatural mountain they call home and discover the fantastical creatures living there. Throughout the series, Freddy and his friends learn to embrace people’s differences and make new friends along the way.

The series is published by Little Bee Books and distributed by Simon & Schuster.

== Books ==
- Monster and Me 1: Who's the Scaredy-Cat? (July 2022)
- Monster and Me 2: The Palace Prankster (July 2022)
- Monster and Me 3: The Unicorn's Spell (October 2022)
- Monster and Me 4: Too Cool for School (March 2023)
- Monster and Me 5: The Impossible Imp (November 2023)
- Monster and Me 6: The Secret Beneath the Palace (April 2024)

== Characters ==
Primary characters include:

- Freddy von Frankenstein – the 8-year-old son of Victor von Frankenstein
- F.M. – the legendary Frankenstein’s Monster
- Riya (Werecat) – a girl with a magical curse from southern India who is adopted by the Frankenstein family
- Binsa – a very smart trans girl from the local Nepalese village
- Igor – Frankenstein’s trouble-making pet golden langur monkey
- Victor von Frankenstein – the famous inventor
- Shan von Frankenstein – Victor’s clever wife of Chinese descent
