= Chitwan Valley =

Valley in southern Nepal

Chitwan Valley चितवन उपत्यका
- Valleys of Nepal
- Country: Nepal
- Province: Bagmati Province
- District: Chitwan District
- Time zone: UTC+5:45 (Nepal Time)

The Chitwan Valley (Nepali: चितवन उपत्यका) is an Inner Terai valley in the south of Nepal, encompassing the districts of Makwanpur, Chitwan and Nawalpur. The valley is part of the Terai-Duar savanna and grasslands ecoregion of about 150 km (93 mi) length and 30–48 km (19–30 mi) width.

Major cities are Hetauda and Ratnanagar in the easternmost part of the valley, Narayangarh and Bharatpur in its central part.

The Chitwan Valley is drained by the East Rapti River, which flows from the eastern Mahabharat Range into the valley near Hetauda, where it turns west and flows along the axis of the valley. About 20 km (12 mi) west of Hetauda the Rapti meets the eastern border of Chitwan National Park. For the next 70 km (43 mi) it forms a natural boundary between human settlements on its right-hand side and protected area on its left-hand side. West of Meghauli it joins the Narayani River, a Ganges tributary called Gandaki River in India.

== Administrative divisions ==
Today, Chitwan Valley is administratively divided into three districts:

- Nawalpur District, a part of Gandaki Province in Nepal
- Chitwan District
- Makwanpur District, both of which are part of the Bagmati Province in Nepal.

== History ==
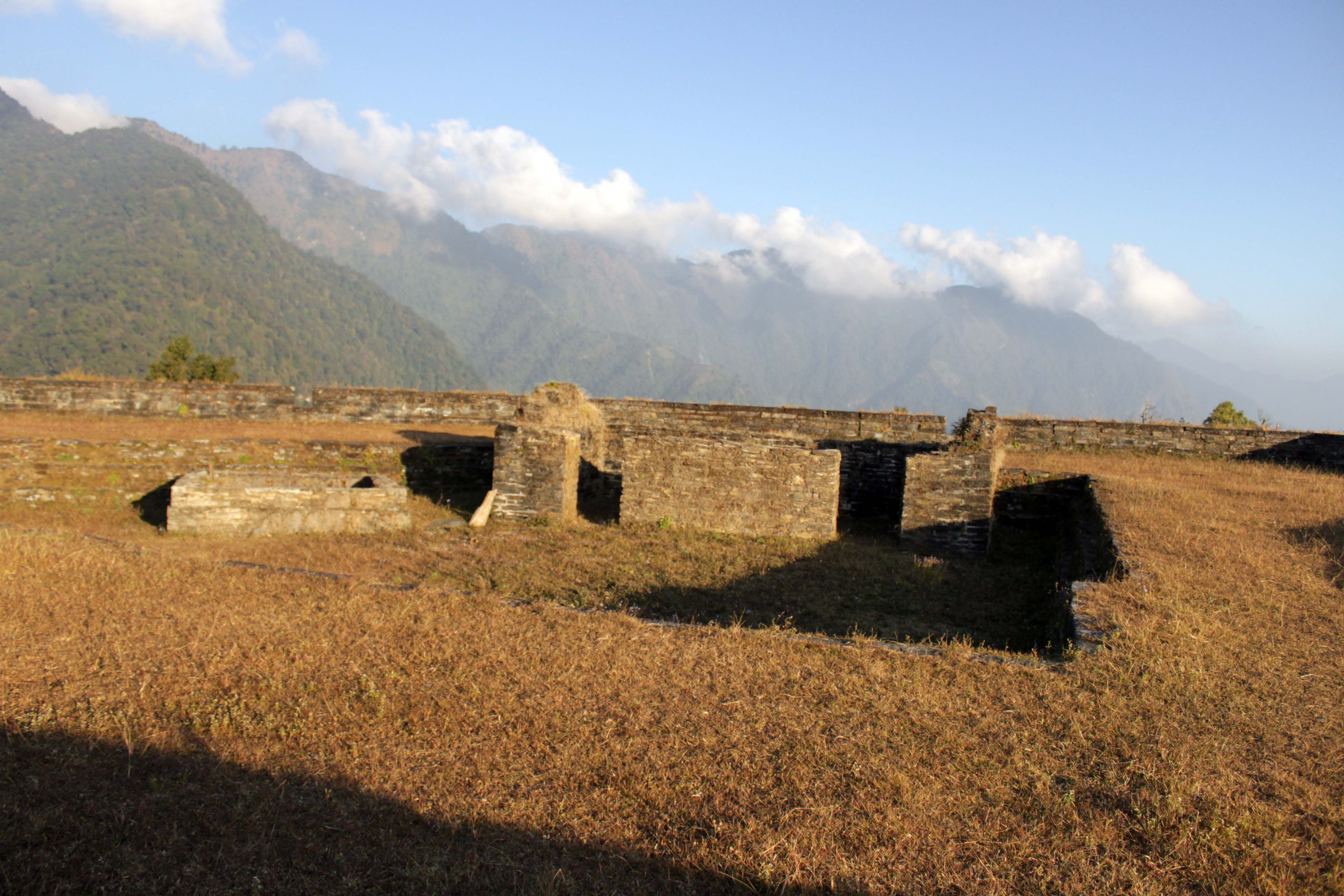
Upardanggadhi

Chitwan Valley was an independent kingdom before Nepal was unified in the late 18th century, its historic capital having been Upardanggadhi. Until the beginning of the 20th century, the main part of the Chitwan Valley was under forest and sparsely populated by ethnic groups, such as the Tharu, Danuwar, Darai and Majhi people who had acquired some resistance against the infectious malaria raging the region. When in the beginning of the 1950s poor farmers from Nepal's mid-hill areas emigrated to the south in search of arable land, the Chitwan Valley was opened for settlement. A malaria-eradication and deforestation scheme using DDT was started in the 1960s with support of the United States. Subsequently, more than 60,000 people of Chepang, Gurung, Magar, Chetri and Bahun ethnic groups, formerly resident only in the mid-hills, have settled here. By 1980 the human population had increased to more than 260,000 people living in some 320 settlements.

== Economy ==
=== Agriculture ===
Agriculture is the main driver of economic output in the valley, with rice as the primary crop. Livestock keeping is an integral part of crop agriculture. Cows and buffalo are raised for draft power and production of manure; cows for milk, buffalo for both milk and meat. Goats and poultry supplement the supply of animal protein. Poultry farming in the valley has increased dramatically since 1995. Groundwater is sufficient to supply two important irrigation systems of Nepal: the Khageri Canal system and Narayani Lift System.

Although it was not traditionally a major industry in the valley, beekeeping has become a significant source of income.

=== Industry ===
The main industrial zone is located near Hetauda. In 1998 Hetauda hosted 22 industrial units in the town's Industrial District. By 2007, already 40 units were operational: textile, chemical, and lime mining plants, among others.

=== Tourism ===
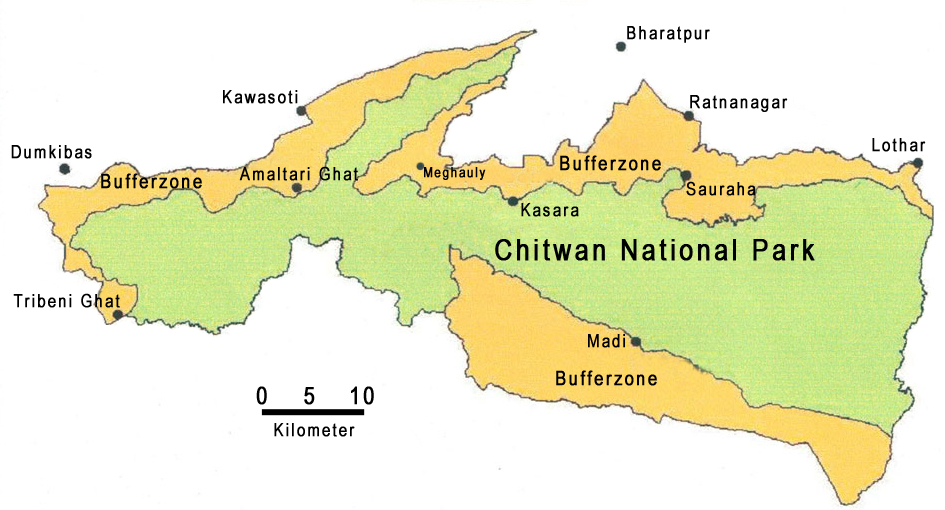
Chitwan National Park with bufferzone

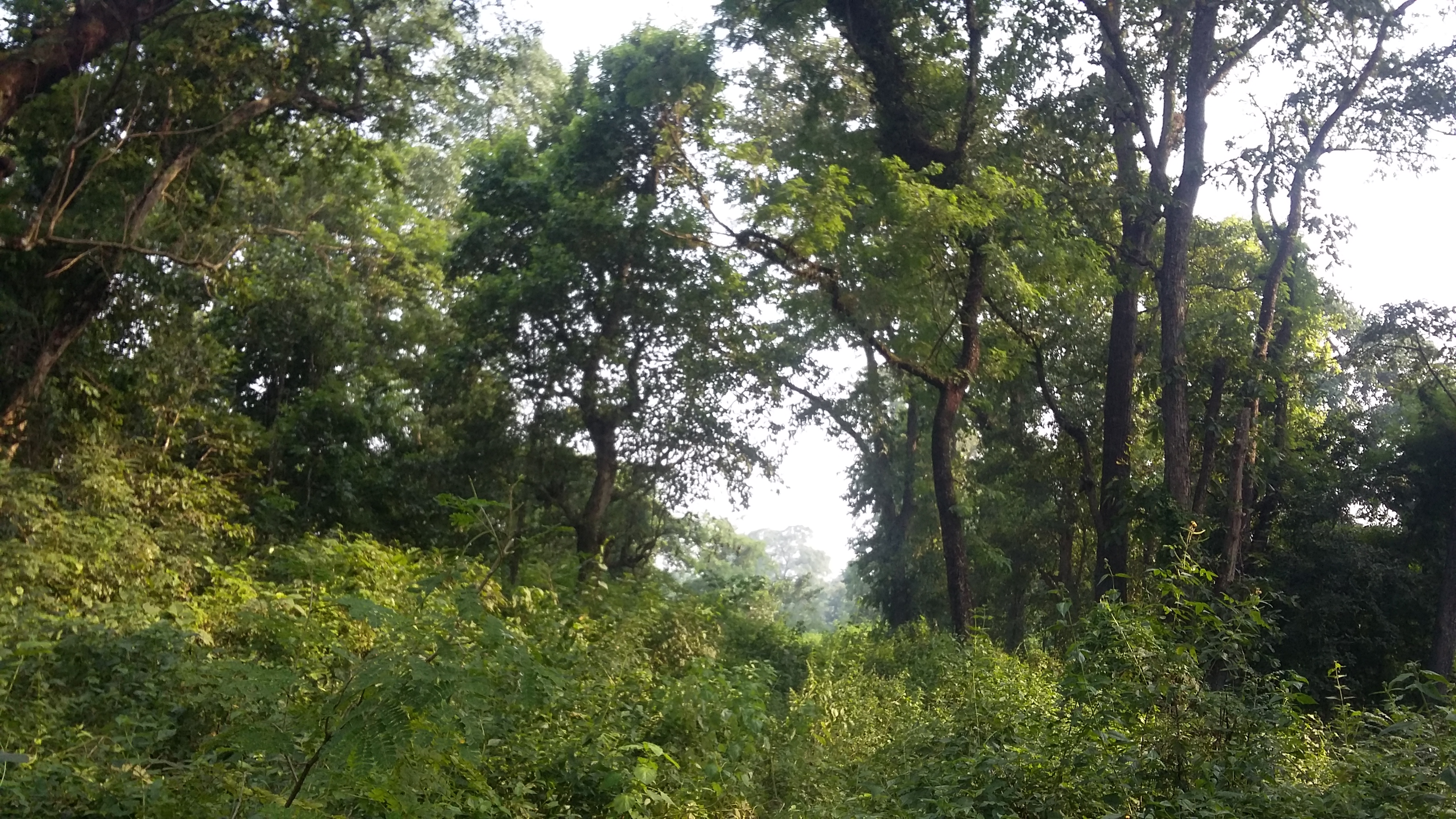
Chitwan National Park Forest

Chitwan National Park is the most popular tourist destination in the Chitwan Valley. The main tourist quarters and entrance to the park is Sauraha, located in the Mrigakunja bufferzone. Tourism provides a steady source of income for the people of the area and plays a vital role in involving local communities in the sustainable conservation of the protected area and its biodiversity. The Chitwan Chepang Hill trail connects the Chitwan National Park with Dhading district.
