= Kakoijana reserved forest =

Forest in Assam, India

Coordinates: 26.456°N 90.632°E

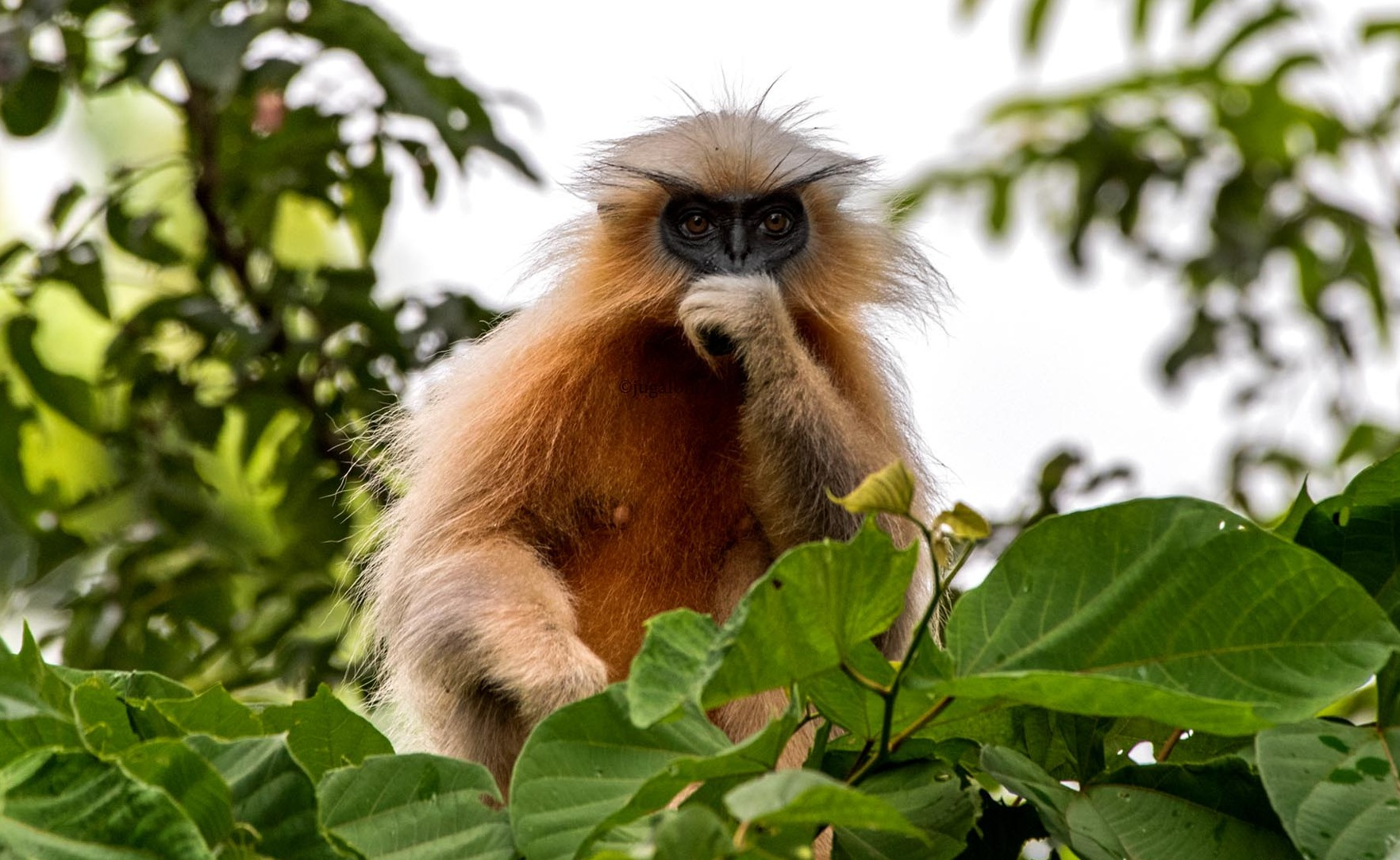

Kakoijana reserved forest is located near Abhayapuri in Bongaigaon district of Assam. The forest is famous for golden langur. The forest is 17.24 km^{2} (6.66 sq mi).

The forest consists of around 450+ endangered Golden langurs, as well as Schedule I endangered species. People and non-governmental organisations are pressing hard to convert it into a wildlife sanctuary. Golden langurs are listed in the category of "rare species" in the Red Data Book of International Union for Conservation of Nature. It is home to rarest & highly endangered species like Binturong, Jungle Fowl, Pangolin, Hornbill, Leopard cat, Porcupine, Python, Lesser Adjutant, Stork, Flying Squirrel, Monitor Lizard, Barking Deer, Mongoose, Civets, Jungle Cat, Wild Cat.

Many research work has been done on primates here.

== History ==
The reserved forest was constituted in the year 1966 as reserved forest. It falls under Aie Valley Division. A petition at the Gauhati High Court was filed demanding it to be declared as a wildlife sanctuary.
