= Kushmanda Sarowar Triveni Dham =

Hindu pilgrimage site in Nepal

- कुष्माण्ड सराेवर त्रिवेणी धाम
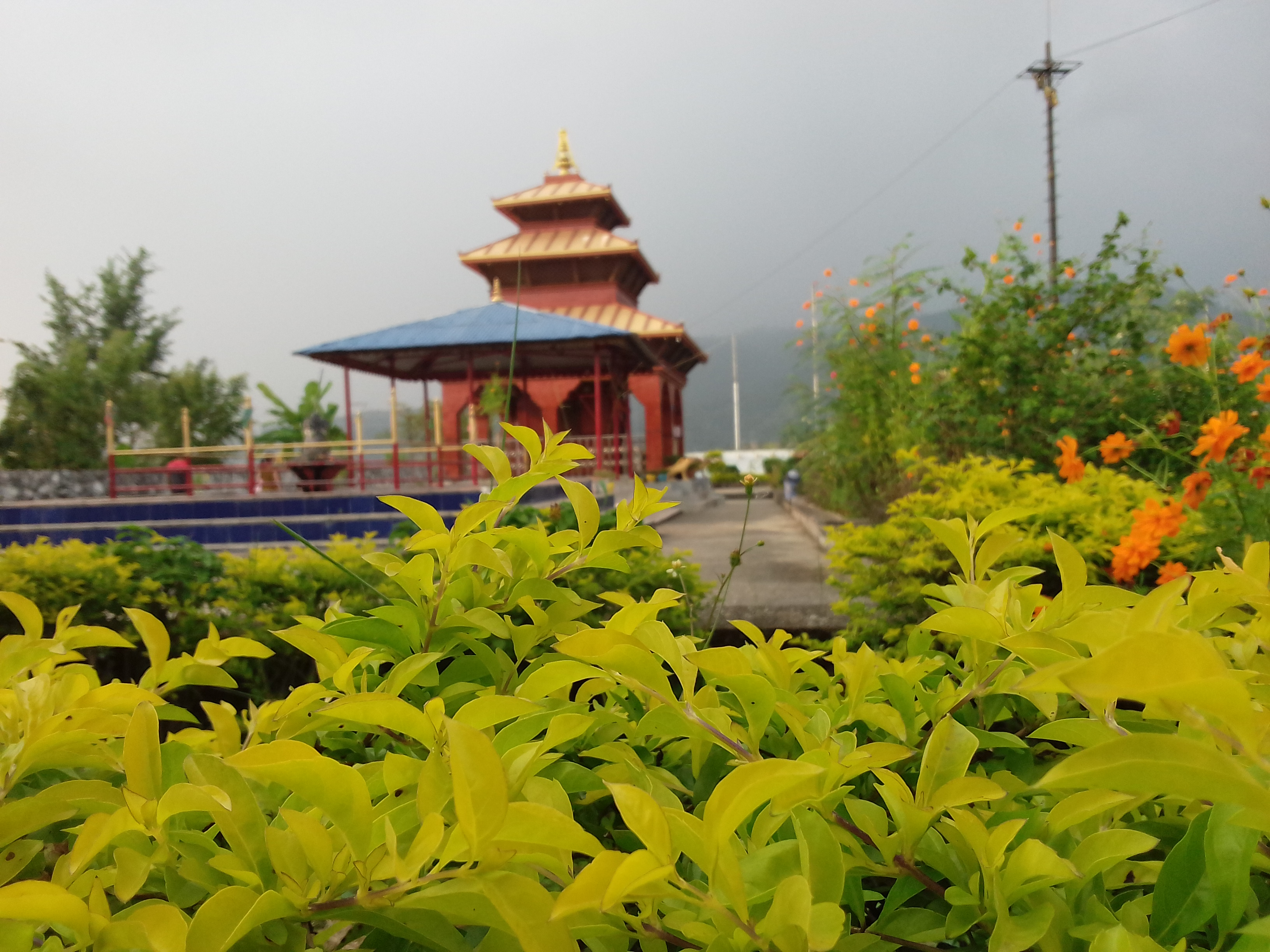

- Location within Nepal

Religion
- Affiliation: Hinduism
- District: Makwanpur
- Deity: Kushmanda Bhagwati
- Festivals: Kushmanda nawami, Makar Sankranti, Haritalika Teej

Location
- Location: Hetauda
- Country: Nepal
- Interactive map of Kushmanda Sarowar Triveni Dham
- Coordinates: 27.419733°N 85.011276°E

Architecture
- Type: Pagoda

Kushmanda Sarowar Triveni Dham (Nepali: कुष्माण्ड सराेवर त्रिवेणी धाम) is a sacred Hindu pilgrimage site dedicated to the Goddess Kushmanda Bhagwati. The name Kushmanda is formed by amalgamation of three words, ku meaning ‘a little’, ushma meaning ‘warmth’ and anda meaning ‘the cosmic egg’. Hence, she is considered as the creator of the universe. She is often shown as having eight or ten hands and holds weapons, rosary, etc. and rides a lion. She is also said to be the happy form of goddess Durga, the fourth of the Navadurga worshipped in Dashahara. It is believed that her smile ended the eternal darkness that was present before the existence of any creation. Winter melon (Kubindo) is the favourite offering for the goddess.

The pilgrimage is located in the outskirts of Hetauda sub-metropolis, in central Nepal. The site is a Triveni sangam (a confluence of three rivers) where two right tributaries Karra and Kukhreni flow into the East Rapti River. The holy site has seen significant development in the last decade. Kushmanda Sarobaar Tribeni Shrine Development Committee oversees the development and promotion of the site. Kushmanda Bhagwati Temple is the center of homage of the site. Kushmanda Sarowar is the holy pond dedicated to Mother Kushmanda. The river banks provide one of the major ritual Hindu cremation sites in Hetauda.

It sees major influx of pilgrims during the festivals of Kushmanda Nawami, Makar Sankranti and Teej. It is believed that she and other gods come to bathe in the holy waters of this site. The devotees take a holy bath by immersing themselves into the waters of Triveni itself or by running under the row of a hundred and eight (108) holy taps that have been built in the temple premises. Tens of thousands of people visit the holy site in Makar Sankranti, taking ritual bathes and performing mass Upanayan of young boys, a Hindu rite of passage. Women observing the festival of Teej also take ritualistic baths here on Rishi Panchami to conclude the festival.

== See also ==
- List of Hindu temples in Nepal
- Hindu pilgrimage sites in Nepal
