= Chitwan Chepang Hill Trail =

Trekking route in Nepal

The Chitwan Chepang Hill Trail is one week trekking route in Nepal that runs from Hugdi River near Krishna Bhir, Dhading District and ends at Shaktikhor, Chitwan District. The Chitwan Chepang Hill Trail passes through remote villages of Chepang people.
