= Jogbudha Valley =

Jogbudha Valley जोगबुढा उपत्यका
- Valleys of Nepal
- Country: Nepal
- Province: Sudurpashchim Province
- District: Dadeldhura District
- Time zone: UTC+5:45 (Nepal Time)

The Jogbuda Valley (जोगबुढा उपत्यका) is a small valley in the south of the Dadeldhura district, Mahakali zone in Nepal's far western region. Streams empty into the Mahakali or Sarda River which rises in the high Himalaya and defines most of Nepal's western border with Uttarakhand, India. Imagery of Jogbuda valley (J): terrain satellite Located in the Outer Terai south of this valley is the Suklaphanta Wildlife Reserve, home of the largest herd of swamp deer in the world. In 1984 UNESCO listed it as a World Heritage Site.

== See also ==
- Geography of Nepal
