= Beyul =

Hidden valleys in Buddhism

According to the beliefs of the Nyingma school of Tibetan Buddhism, Beyul (Tibetan: སྦས་ཡུལ, Wylie: sbas-yul) are hidden valleys often encompassing hundreds of square kilometers, which Padmasambhava blessed as refuges. Tertöns may reveal them from terma at specific and appropriate times. Their locations were kept on scrolls (lamyig or neyig) hidden under rocks and inside caves, monasteries and stupas. They are places where physical and spiritual worlds overlap, and tantric practice effectiveness increases with multiple perception dimensions.

Padmasambhava assigned deities to protect the beyul. Protective forces manifest as snowstorms, mists and snow leopards. Buddhist texts indicate beyul are discovered when the planet is approaching destruction and the world becomes too corrupt for spiritual practice. They describe valleys reminiscent of paradise, which can only be reached with enormous hardship. Pilgrims who travel to these wild and distant places often recount extraordinary experiences similar to those encountered by Buddhist spiritual practitioners on the path to liberation. People who try to force their way in may encounter failure and death. Earthly beyuls share significant characteristics with Shambhala.

An attempt to open a beyul occurred in 1962, when the Tibetan lama Tulshuk Lingpa journeyed to Sikkim in order to 'open' Beyul Demoshong, a beyul fabled to exist on the slopes of Mount Kanchenjunga straddling the Nepal–Sikkim border. He took with him over 300 followers from across the Himalayas and Tibet, each of whom had supposedly given away his or her worldly goods. Unfortunately most of the group – including the lama – were killed by an avalanche.

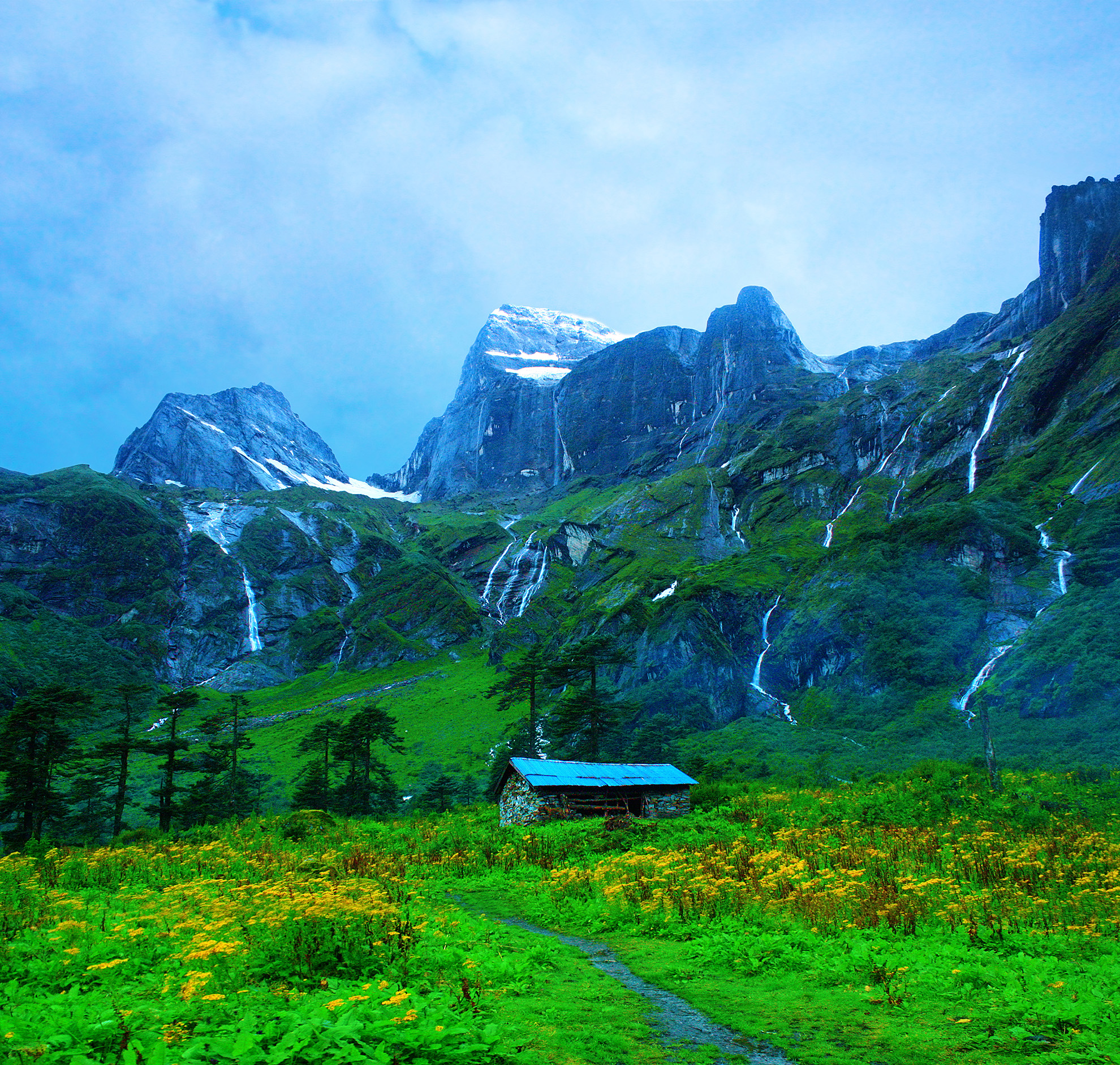
Nghe-Beyul at Barun Valley.

Beyul are often understood to embody dharmapala and lords of the land, which are associated with geographic features such as mountains, trees, rocks, and water sources. Pilgrims make ritual offerings to these beings to appease their wrathful nature, and to renew the symbolic unity that people share with them. It has been argued that this attitude indicates a sustainable approach toward land stewardship.

In Nepal and Tibet around Mount Everest are the Khenbalung, Solukhumbu, Rolwaling, Rongshar, Kyirong and Nubri sacred valleys. The Sherpa people discovered Solukhumbu when they left Tibet to escape religious persecution in the 15th and 16th centuries. They entered the valley to seek refuge and made a new homeland there. Buddhist monasteries and sacred mountains have brought many spiritual travelers to Solukhumbu. Beyul are found in the Himalayan regions of Nepal, Tibet,Sikkim, Bhutan, India, China and Pakistan.

== See also ==
- Barun Valley
- Langtang valley
- Pemako
- Poyul and Powo Kingdom
- Sagarmatha National Park
- Shangri-La
