= Jamunapur =

Coordinates: 27°39′N 84°31′E

Jamunapur is a village in the Ratnanagar Municipality of the Chitwan District in Nepal. It lies on the eastern side of Chitwan district.

Like any other villages in Chitwan, Jamunapur is inhabited by a very diverse community of people who migrated to this place from different parts of Nepal. It is often said that Chitwan is a 76th district, as this place is traditionally inhabited by people representing all other 75 districts of Nepal. But it can be seen that most of people are from Gorkha district. Lying 4 km northern side of the east west highway at the central part of the country, this place has poultry and cotton industries, besides the tourism industry, as major industries of the region.

An old stream named Budikula lies in eastern side of this village but water randomly flows in it. You can see flowing water only in Rainy seasons.

There is a private school named Sagarmatha Secondary Boarding School and a government primary school named Shree Rastriya Prathamik School. A NGO named JAMUNAPUR HELP SOCIETY is also established there for conducting social-welfare programmes for the inhabitants of JAMUNAPUR village.
