= Barun Valley =

Valley in Nepal

Coordinates: 27°46′N 87°09′E

Barun valley
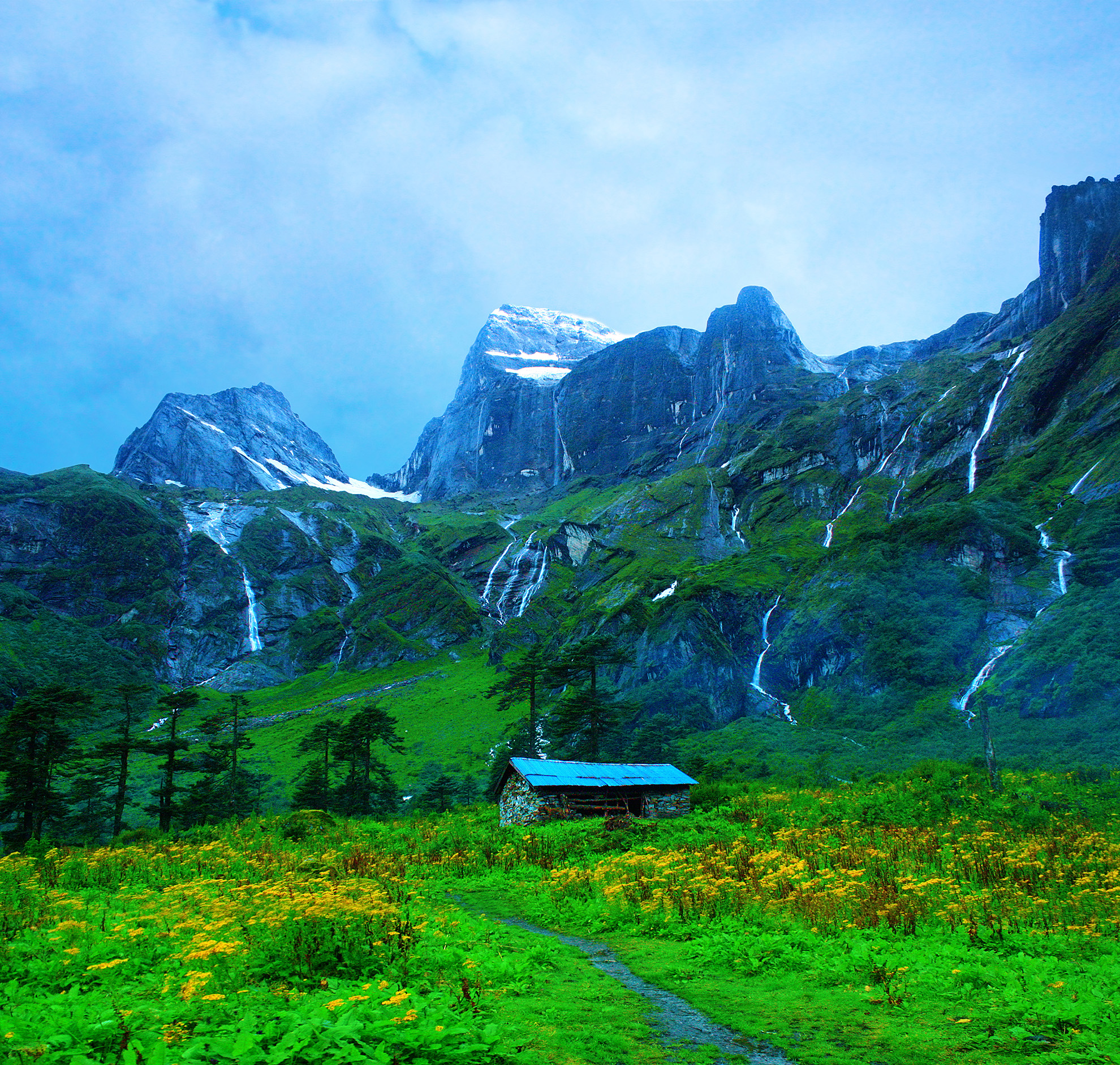
- A place called Nghe within Barun Valley. Nghe in local Sherpa language means a 'Sacred place'.
- Length: 46 km (29 mi)

Naming
- Native name: Chukchuwa Upatyaka (Nepali)

Geography
- Country: Nepal
- State: Province No. 1
- District: Sankhuwasabha,
- Interactive map of Barun valley

Barun Valley (बरुण उपत्यका) is a Himalayan valley situated at the base of Mt. Makalu in the Sankhuwasabha district of Nepal. This valley rests entirely inside the Makalu Barun National Park.

== History ==
The valley was created by the Barun River which becomes a glacier in winter. The river is known as Chukchuwa in the local Limbu language. The study has shown that this place was originally inhabited by Yakkha and Limbu centuries ago.

== Beyul ==
In the ancient religious Buddhist books, seven Beyul ( Nghe-Beyul Khimpalung) situated in the Himalayan region are described as mystical and spectacularly beautiful evergreen places where no one gets old. It is told that, in case of great cataclysm, life will remain only in these seven areas of the world. In those books, one of the Beyul is mentioned to be situated somewhere in this Makalu-Barun region.

== Places ==
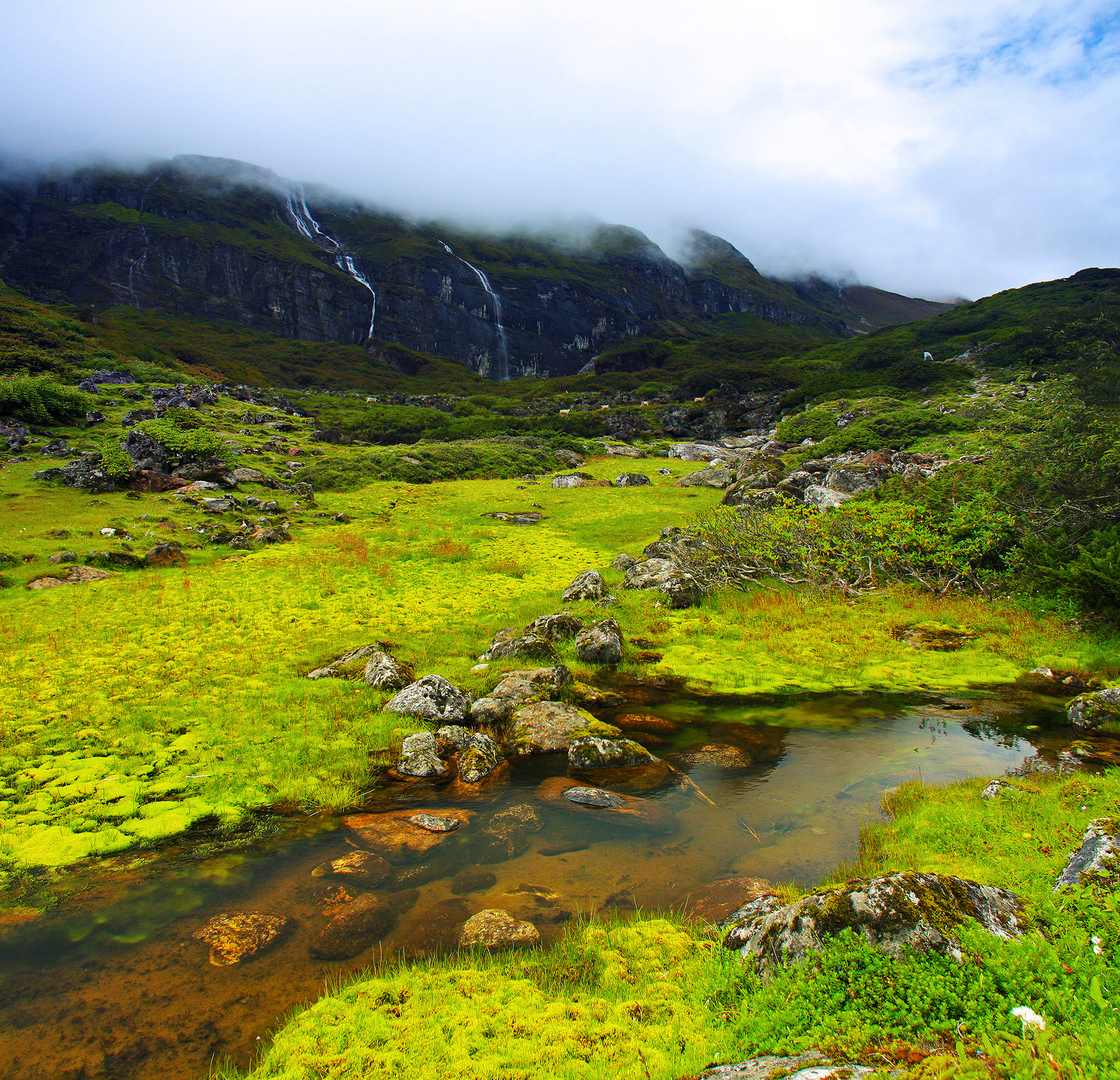
This is a place called Ripuk within the Barun Valley. Centuries ago, Barun used to be a glacier here, flowing to the north composing these lush green valleys of today.

All of this valley is uninhabited. It is mostly covered by grassland (Kharka). In the summer, some temporary camps are made. Listed below are the names of these camping regions.

- Mumbuk
- Yangle Kharka
- Nghe
- Ripuk
- Tadaso
- Yak Kharka
- Langmale
- Shershon

== Flora and fauna ==
The Barun Valley climbs from Eastern Himalayan broadleaf forests at low elevations through Eastern Himalayan subalpine conifer forests and into Eastern Himalayan alpine shrub and meadows.

Recognized for its tremendous diversity of plants, animals, and people, the area contains over 3,000 species of flowering plants, including 25 species of rhododendron, 47 types of orchids, and 56 rare plants. 440 species of birds, and 75 species of mammals, including the endangered clouded leopard (snow leopard), red panda, musk deer, wild boar, have been recorded.

This remarkable biodiversity is considered to be of global significance and provides a living laboratory for international scientific research. The Barun Valley is part of a huge international protected area under an agreement between Nepal and China.

Plants like Swertia Barunensis (4200m) and Potentilla Makaluensis (4000 m) nomenclature under the name of river Barun and Mt. Makalu are found only in this area in the entire world. 87 Himalayan medical herbs including Yasrha Gumba and Panch Aule are found here. Panch Aule is a fingered root plant (five fingers max) where fingers indicate the age of the plant in a year.

== The trek ==
This valley lies along the trekking route to Makalu Base Camp. This somewhat difficult yet extremely rewarding trek offers a true wilderness experience in the rugged uninhabited terrain of Makalu-Barun National Park. These days there are lodges above Tashigaon till the Base Camp, so one does not need to take camping gear, food and fuel further on. However, the lodges may not have enough blankets for visitors, so it is advisable to take a sleeping bag along. The use of a local guide is strongly recommended, as the trails are difficult to follow in some places.

== Other Attractions ==
Shiva Dhara (शिवधारा) This domelike cave, about 500 feet high, has a large waterfall coming out of its stone roof. The waterfall is considered a sacred tap of Lord Shiva. To get to this place one has to climb an extremely dangerous cliff with the help of locals, which will take about three to four hours.

=== Tadasho ===
This is a large stone cliff with a hole in its face, through which a waterfall cascades. Local legend has it that a dark lake lay atop the cliff, which mysteriously caused the deaths of many Tibetan refugees after nightfall. A Buddhist monk named Rinpoche broke the cliff with his Tadasho, to destroy the lake and save the lives of the Tibetan refugees.

== See also ==
- Makalu
- Makalu Barun National Park
