= Karra River =

River in Central Nepal

Coordinates: 27°25′17″N 85°00′44″E

The Karra River (Karra Khola or Karrakhola in Nepali) is a river in Makawanpur district of Bagmati Province in Nepal. A right tributary of the East Rapti River, the Karra originates in the north-eastern Siwalik hills. It has numerous tributary rivulets. It flows from east to west direction. It is one of the main tributaries of the East Rapti. It flows through the middle of Hetauda sub-metropolitan city, before draining into East Rapti along with Kukhreni, another (minor) right tributary of East Rapti, in the outskirts of the city, forming a holy Triveni Sangam. The confluence is the site of Kusmanda Sarowar Triveni Dham, one of the major Triveni pilgrimages for Hindus in Nepal.

The flow of Karra was found to be about 0.84 cubic meters per second in the dry seasons, and the minimum flow right before monsoon was measured to be between 0.65 and 0.75 cubic meters per second. It floods in the monsoon, occasionally causing damage. On 24 July 2019, a severe flooding caused by heavy monsoon rains caused the river to gush into human settlement, submerging dozens of houses in Shantinagar and Gardoi localities of Hetauda. Several civilians needed rescuing and a truck was swept away.

Because it passes right through the city, and Hetauda Industrial district has been built in its banks, it is significantly polluted near the confluence compared to other rivers in the region, although it is as clean as other rivers upstream from the industrial sites in Hetauda. This is despite a wastewater treatment plant being operated to filter the sewage and waste from the industrial district before it's dumped into the river. According to a government report, waste from less than half of all industries in the industrial district were processed by the plant, with other industries dumping their sewage directly into the river.
