= Shershon =

Human settlement in Nepal

Shershon is a settlement on the north side of the Lower Barun Glacier in Nepal. It is about 14 miles (23 km) south-east of Mount Everest.
