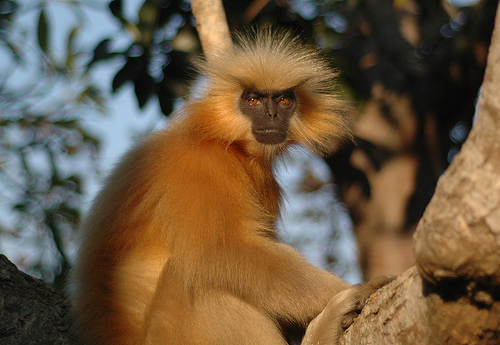

Conservation status
- Endangered (IUCN 3.1)
- CITES Appendix I

Scientific classification
- Kingdom: Animalia
- Phylum: Chordata
- Class: Mammalia
- Order: Primates
- Family: Cercopithecidae
- Genus: Trachypithecus
- Species: T. geei

Binomial name
- Trachypithecus geei (Khajuria, 1956)

Subspecies
- Trachypithecus geei geei Khajuria, 1956; Trachypithecus geei bhutanensis Wangchuk, 2003
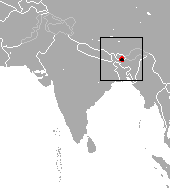
- Gee's golden langur geographic range

= Gee's golden langur =

Species of Old World monkey

Gee's golden langur (Trachypithecus geei), also known as simply the golden langur, is an Old World monkey found in a small region of Western Assam, India and the neighboring foothills of the Black Mountains of Bhutan. Long considered sacred by many Himalayan people, the golden langur was first brought to the attention of the Western world by the naturalist Edward Pritchard Gee in the 1950s. Adult males have a cream to golden coat with darker flanks while the females and juveniles are lighter. The golden langur has a black face and a long tail up to 100 cm (39 in) in length. It lives in high trees and has a herbivorous diet of fruits, leaves, seeds, buds, and flowers. The average group size is eight individuals, with a ratio of several females to each adult male. It is one of the most endangered primate species of India and Bhutan.

In 2008–09, there were 6,000 golden langurs in India, which has grown to 7,396 by 2020–21.

== Discovery and etymology ==
The earliest record of the golden langur is in an 1838 paper by Robert Boileau Pemberton which states that "Griffith observed these monkeys near Tongso in Central Bhutan." However, since Pemberton's work was lost and not rediscovered until the 1970s, the scientific discovery of the golden langur unfolded differently. In 1907, Edward Oswald Shebbeare—who was out with some hunters and forest rangers—reported seeing a "cream coloured langur" in the vicinity of the Jamduar. (Note: Jamduar was a village in the early 1900s, which is now a part of the town of Kokrajhar) However, neither a photograph nor a live or dead specimen was presented at that time. The first reference to the golden langur in print, as an animal of unidentified taxonomic status, was in a 1919 publication that stated: "Pithecus sp? – A pale yellow coloured langur is common in the adjoining district of Goalpara (Assam). Jerdon reported one from Terai, the adjacent district on the (west) side, which Blanford suggested might be P. entellus."

In February 1947, in the Forest Rest House visitors' book in Raimona, a few miles south of Jamduar, C. G. Baron reported seeing some langurs whose "whole body and tail is one colour – a light silvery-gold, somewhat like the hair of a blonde." A year later, back in Jamduar, H. E. Tyndale, a tea planter, reported seeing "Sankosh cream langurs." However, it wasn't until a few years later that a focused effort to identify the golden langur was mounted by Gee, who traveled back to Jamduar in November 1953. His team was able to observe three groups of golden langurs, all on the east bank of the Sankosh River. The first group was observed on the Bhutan side of the border; the second group, a large one of 30 to 40 individuals, a mile north of Jamduar on the Indian side; and a third group four to five miles (6.44 km to 8.05 km) south near Raimona. Colour movies of the second group were made by Gee.

In August 1954, Gee reported his findings to an expert at the Zoological Society of London, who advised that the golden langur might be a new species. In January 1955, Gee also reported his results to the Zoological Survey of India (ZSI) and, after showing his movies of the golden langurs, suggested that Jamduar be included in the then-upcoming ZSI survey of that region. The suggestion received the support of Dr. Sunder Lal Hora, then Director of ZSI, and later that year six specimens of the golden langur were collected by the survey party. The following year, Dr. H. Khajuria, a taxonomist who studied the specimens, described the new species naming it Presbystis geei in honour of Gee. (Note: The new name, Presbystis geei, came to be inadvertently included in Gee's 1955 short note which was published two months before Khajuria's 1956 paper proposing the name.)

=== Taxonomy ===
There are two subspecies of this species:

- Trachypithecus geei geei Khajuria, 1956
- Trachypithecus geei bhutanensis Wangchuk, 2003

The subspecies are separated by a geological fault in the Himalayas called the Main Frontal Thrust. T. g. bhutanensis occurs in the northern part of the species range in Bhutan and T. g. geei is found in the south of Bhutan and Assam in northern India.

In Bhutan, it has hybridised with T. pileatus, the capped langur. This is believed to be due to the construction of permanent bridges across the Chamkar River, a tributary of the Mangde River which separates the two species.

== Physical description ==
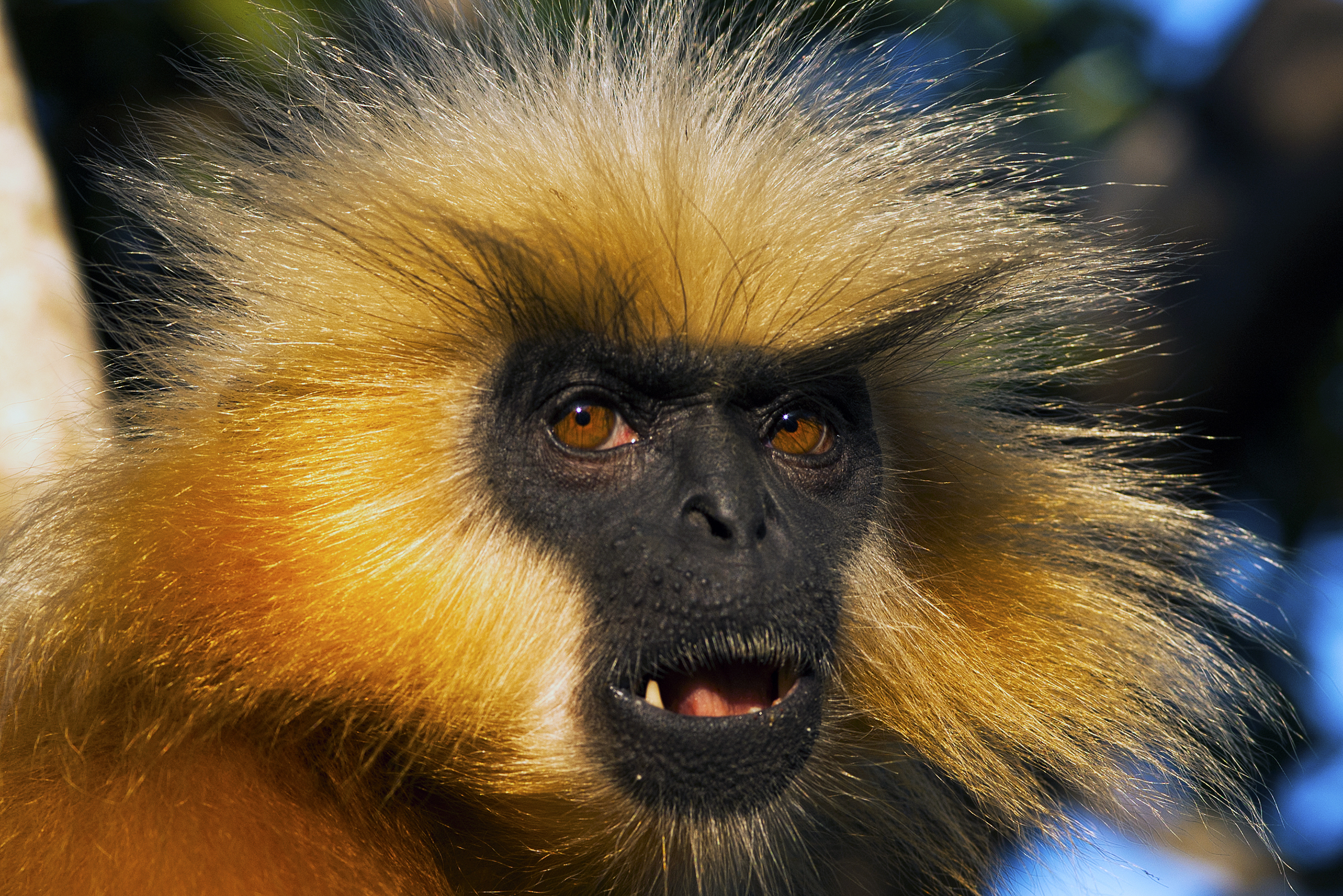
Closeup of face

In online viral imagery of this species, many commentators have noted that its uncanny gaze appears remarkably human. This is likely due to the light sclera in its eyes, a feature seen in some great apes, including humans.

The coat of the adult golden langur ranges from cream to golden, on its flanks and chest the hairs are darker and often rust coloured while the coats of the juveniles and females are lighter, silvery white to light buff. The coat changes color seasonally, from white or cream coloured in the summer to dark golden or chestnut in the winter. Their long whiskers protect their eyes from rain during monsoon. The golden langur has a black face and a large whorl of hair on its crown.

Gee's golden langur exhibits sexual dimorphism. Males are larger and more robust than females. Adult males weigh 10.8 kg (24 lb) on average and adult females weigh 9.5 kg (21 lb). The length of the head and body ranges from 50–75 cm (20–30 in), while the relatively long tail is 70–100 cm (28–39 in) in length.

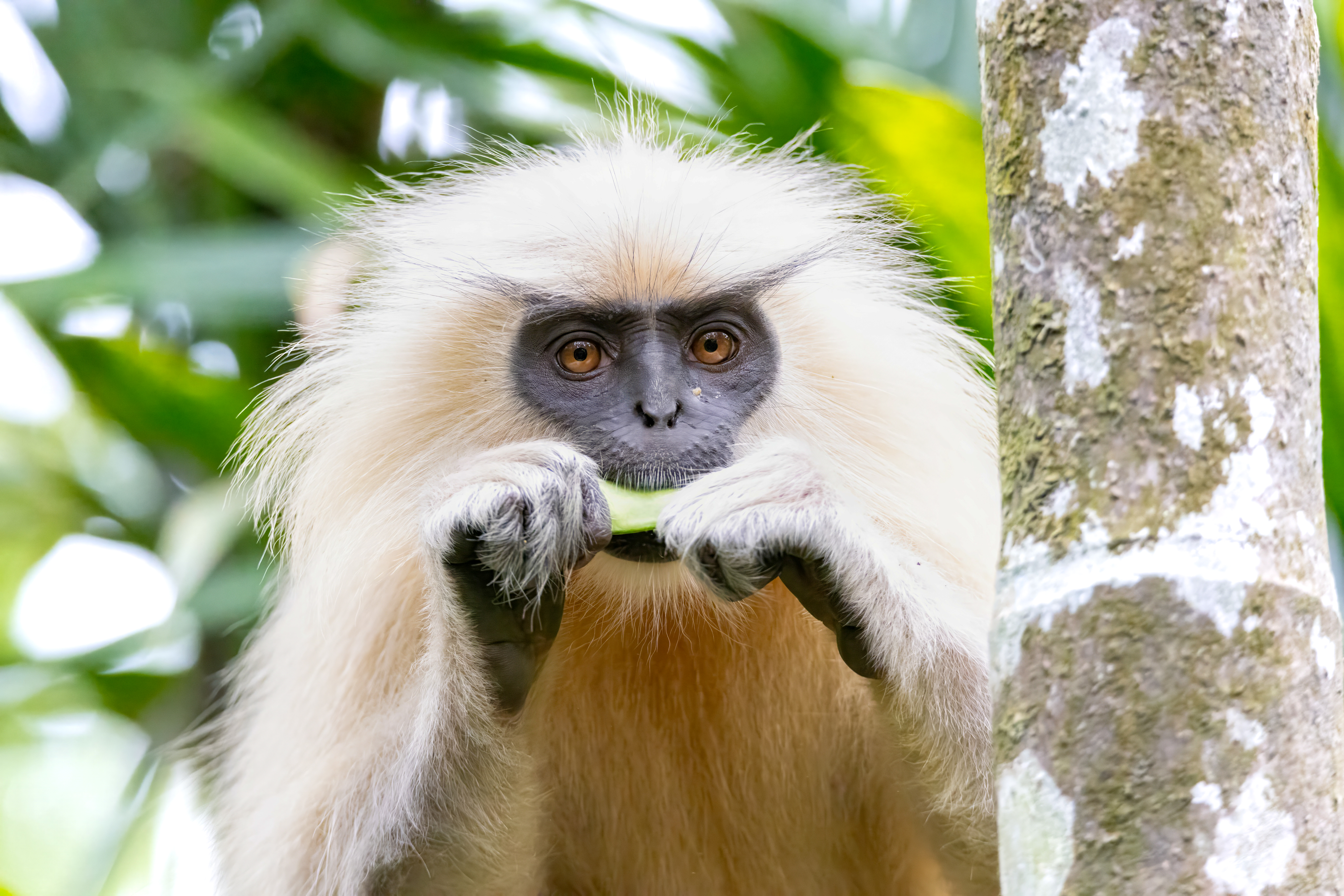
Golden langur male feeding on seed pod in Kakoijana Reserved Forest

== Distribution ==
Gee's golden langur is found in an area of approximately 30,000 square kilometres (12,000 sq mi), much of which is unsuitable habitat, bounded on the south by the Brahmaputra River, on the east by the Manas River, on the west by the Sankosh River, in Assam, India, and on the north by the Black Mountains of Bhutan. These biogeographical barriers are believed to have led to the radiation of species from the closely related capped langur (Trachypithecus pileatus). There are two primary sub-populations fragmented by the National Highway 27. The northern sub-population occupies the western portion of the Manas National Park, extending from the Sankosh River to the Manas River along the northern side of National Highway 27 and State Highway 2, reaching the India-Bhutan border. Conversely, the southern sub-population is situated along the southern side of NH27, extending to the Brahmaputra River. Population estimates of the 2020–21 survey, indicate a larger northern population, totaling 5,566 individuals distributed across 534 groups and 23 lone males. In contrast, the southern fragmented population consists of approximately 1,830 langurs organized into 173 groups and eight lone males. Notably, the Ripu Reserve Forest hosts the highest number (2,847 individuals) within the northern sub-population, while the Chakrashila Wildlife Sanctuary in Kokrajhar district harbors the most significant number (838 individuals) within the southern fragmented range.

In 1988, two captive groups of Gee's golden langur were released into the wild in Tripura state in north-eastern India, an area outside of their natural range. One of the groups, released into Sepahijala Wildlife Sanctuary, survives and has adapted to the wild.

== Behavior and ecology ==
For the most part, the langur is confined to high trees where its long tail serves as a balancer when it leaps across branches. During the rainy season it obtains water from dew and rain-drenched leaves. Its diet is herbivorous, consisting of ripe and unripe fruits, mature and young leaves, seeds, buds and flowers. It generally lives in troops of about 8, with a ratio of several females to each adult male. The smallest golden langur troop was composed of four individuals, while the largest had 22, giving an average value of 8.2 individuals per troop. The adult sex ratio was 2.3 females to every male, although the majority of groups had only one adult male.

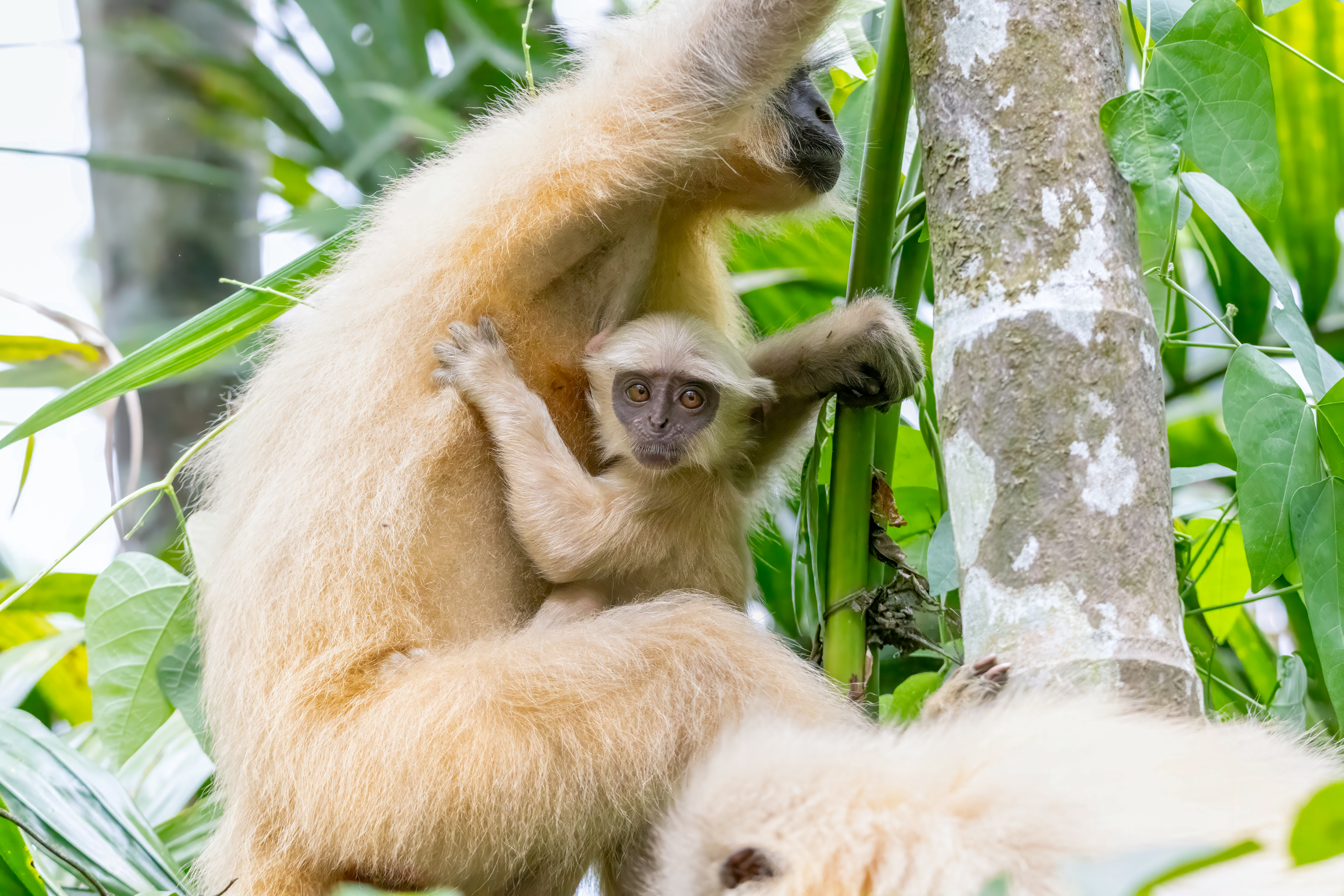
Golden langur mother with newborn in Kakoijana Reserved Forest

== Conservation ==
Gee's golden langur is currently endangered with a decreasing population trend; the total population of mature adults has been estimated as 6000–6500. It is one of the most endangered primate species of India and Bhutan. In India, 93% of the population is found in forest reserves (Chirang, Manas, and Ripu) and the western part of Manas National Park, and the remaining occur in several small isolated fragments. The population has declined by more than 30% in the last 30 years and is expected to decline further shortly. Golden langurs are protected by law in their range. The species is listed in Appendix I of CITES, and in Schedule I of both, the Wildlife Protection Act, 1972 of India, and the Forest and Nature Conservation Act of Bhutan, 1995.

=== Within India ===
On 5 June 2019, the district authorities of Bongaigaon district in Assam launched a project under the MGNREGA to plant guava, mango, blackberry and other fruit trees to ensure that the resident golden langurs of the Kakoijana reserved forest do not have to risk their lives to find food. Several golden langurs have died due to electrocution and in road accidents while looking for food beyond the reserve forests. In 1988, two captive groups of golden langurs were released into two protected areas of the western region of the state of Tripura, India. As of 2000, one of these groups, consisting of six (and possibly eight) individuals in the Sepahijala Wildlife Sanctuary, had survived. The relative death of infants and juveniles indicates a declining population with the habitat being degraded by human activity. A fragmented but protected population in a rubber plantation in the Nayakgaon, Kokrajhar, district of Assam increased in population from 38 individuals in 1997 to 52 in 2002. The population has also adapted to feeding on dry rubber seeds.
