= Sauraha =

Sauraha सौराहा
- Village in Ratnanagar Municipality
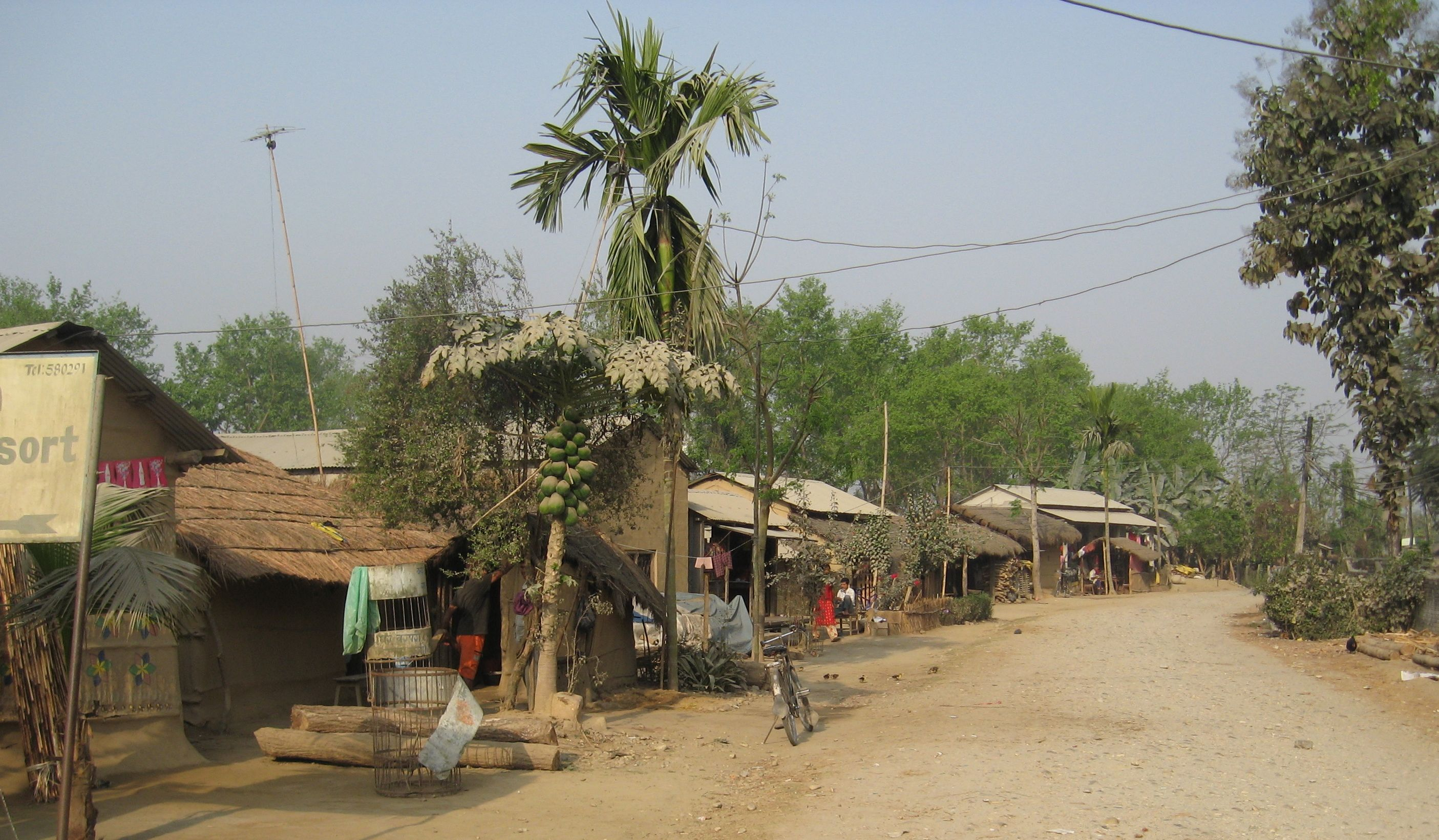

- Location in Nepal
- Coordinates: 27°34′29″N 84°29′37″E
- Country: Nepal
- Province: Bagmati Province
- District: Chitwan District

Population (1991)
  - Total: 2,699
- Time zone: UTC+5:45 (Nepal Time)

Sauraha is a village of Ratnanagar Municipality in Chitwan District and Chitwan Valley, in Bagmati Province of southern Nepal.
