= Bachhayauli =

Village development committee in Bagmati Province, Nepal

Coordinates: 27°35′N 84°31′E

Bachhayauli बछ्यौली
- Village development committee
- Motto: kathar
- Interactive map of Bachhayauli
- Country: Nepal
- Province: Bagmati Province
- District: Chitwan District

Population (1991)
  - Total: 8,338
- Time zone: UTC+5:45 (Nepal Time)

Bachhayauli is a village development committee in Chitwan District in Bagmati Province of southern Nepal. At the time of the 1991 Nepal census it had a population of 8338 people living in 1356 individual households.
