= Gaidakhola Tole =

Village in Nepal

Gaidakhola Tole is a small village in Nepal. It was located in Jutpani VDC ward no: 3 in Chitwan District in Bagmati Province of southern Nepal At the time of the 1991 Nepal census.
