= Udayapur Valley =

Udayapur Valley उदयपुर उपत्यका
- Valleys of Nepal
- Country: Nepal
- Province: Koshi Province
- District: Udayapur District
- Time zone: UTC+5:45 (Nepal Time)

The Udayapur Valley is in Udayapur district in southeastern Nepal. It is about 30 km (19 mi) long and between 2 km (1.2 mi) and 4 km (2.5 mi) wide. It is drained by the Triyuga river flowing east to join the great Koshi River. This valley lies between the Mahabharat Range to the north and the Sivalik Hills to the south, with an average elevation of about 430 m (1,410 ft).

The mouth of the valley opens onto a 175 km (109 mi) rectangle of land where the Triyuga meets the Koshi river above the Koshi Barrage. It was designated the Koshi Tappu Wildlife Reserve in 1976, and is home to the last remaining population of wild Asian water buffalo in Nepal. The reserve is mostly wetlands, subject to seasonal flooding, but also includes some grasslands and small patches of riverine forest. It is a Ramsar Site.
