= Shaktikhor =

Shaktikhor शक्तिखोर
- Village development committee
- Location in Nepal
- Coordinates: 27.73°N 84.59°E
- Country: Nepal
- Zone: Narayani Zone
- District: Chitwan District

Government
  - Type: Municipality

Population (2011)
  - Total: 11,470
- Time zone: UTC+5:45 (Nepal Time)

Shaktikhor is a village development committee in Chitwan District in the Narayani Zone of southern Nepal. At the time of the 2011 Nepal census, it had a population of 11,470 people living in 944 individual households.
