= Ratnanagar =

Municipality in Bagmati Province, Nepal

Ratnanagar रत्‍ननगर
- Municipality (नगरपालिका)
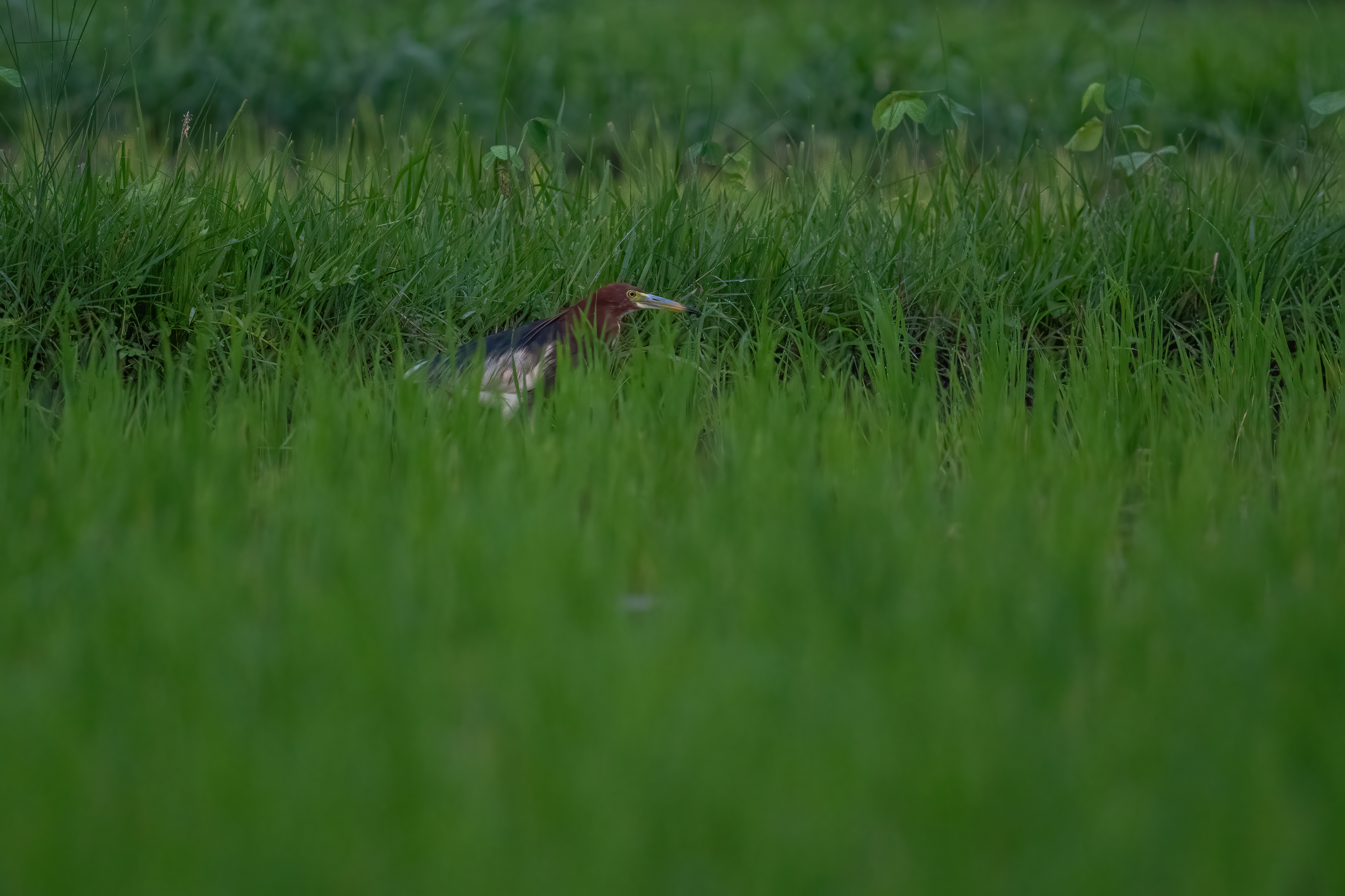

- Location in Nepal Ratnanagar (Nepal)
- Coordinates: 27°37′N 84°30′E
- Country: Nepal
- Province: Bagmati
- District: Chitwan
- Established: 1997

Government
  - Mayor: Parlad Sapkota (NC)
  - Deputy Mayor: Yadav Prasad Pathak (CPN-UML)

Area
  - Total: 68.6 km^{2} (26.5 sq mi)
- Elevation: 200 m (660 ft)

Population (2011)
  - Total: 69,851
  - Density: 1,020/km^{2} (2,640/sq mi)
- Time zone: UTC+5:45 (NST)
- Postal code: 44204
- Climate: Cwa
- Website: www.ratnanagarmun.gov.np/en

Ratnanagar (Nepali: रत्‍ननगर) is a municipality in the Chitwan District of Bagmati Province, Nepal. It was established in 1997 through the merger of the former Village Development Committees of Old-Ratnanagar and Panchakanya.

Located adjacent to Chitwan National Park, Ratnanagar serves as a gateway to the park. Agriculture is the primary occupation, with rice, maize, mustard, and vegetables as major crops. Poultry farming and animal husbandry also contribute significantly to the local economy. Tourism is another important sector, particularly in nearby Sauraha, a hub for hotels, resorts, shops, and an Elephant Breeding Station.

The municipality has also introduced eco-friendly electric rickshaws to promote environmental preservation. It lies on the bank of the East Rapti River. In 2014, the former VDCs Bachhayauli and Pithuwa were merged into Ratnanagar.

== Demographics ==
According to the 2011 Nepal census, Ratnanagar Municipality had a population of 70,226.

=== Languages ===
The most widely spoken first languages were:

Language	Percentage
Nepali	70.2%
Tharu	16.6%
Tamang	3.9%
Bhojpuri	2.6%
Newar	1.6%
Darai	1.2%
Gurung	0.9%
Magar	0.7%
Hindi	0.7%
Maithili	0.6%
Chepang	0.3%
Urdu	0.1%
Bote	0.1%
Rai	0.1%
Kumal	0.1%
Other	0.1%

=== Ethnicity/caste ===
The largest ethnic/caste groups were:

Ethnicity/caste	Percentage
Hill Brahmin	33.1%
Tharu	17.7%
Chhetri	12.4%
Tamang	6.7%
Newar	6.4%
Kami	3.4%
Gurung	2.9%
Magar	2.9%
Musalman	2.5%
Damai/Dholi	1.7%
Sarki	1.4%
Darai	1.3%
Kumal	1.2%
Sanyasi/Dasnami	1.1%
Gharti/Bhujel	0.7%
Chepang	0.5%
Thakuri	0.5%
Kalwar	0.4%
Musahar	0.3%
Rai	0.3%
Other minorities	<0.3%

=== Religion ===
By religion, the population was:

Religion	Percentage
Hindu	87.9%
Buddhist	7.2%
Muslim	2.5%
Christian	2.0%
Prakriti	0.1%
Other	0.2%

== Ward profile ==
Presidents of wards:

Ward No.	President	Party
1	Kul Prasad Sapkota	NC
2	Rajendra Prasad Ghimire	NC
3	Sohendra Raj Kharel	NC
4	Ram Kumar Chaudhary	NC
5	Balkrishna Chapagai	NC
6	Kiran Mahato	NC
7	Sajna Mahato	CPN-UML
8	Krishna Chaudhary	NC
9	Anant Adhikari	Independent
10	Kaladhar Paudel	NC
11	Shyam Kumar Shrestha	CPN-UML
12	Sundarmani Subedi	Maoist Centre
13	Pot Bahadur Ghimire	CPN-UML
14	Hom Nath Ranabhat	NC
15	Ashik Tamang	CPN-UML
16	Hem Raj Thapa	CPN-UML

== Transportation ==
Ratnanagar lies on the Mahendra Highway, one of the main highways in Nepal. A 3 km stretch of the highway passes through the municipality.

== Media ==
To promote local culture and broadcast community news, Ratnanagar has three community radio stations: Radio Arpan (104.5 MHz), Radio Chitwan (94.6 MHz), and Relation FM.

== See also ==
- Sauraha
