= East Rapti River =

Coordinates: 26.2950°N 83.6689°E

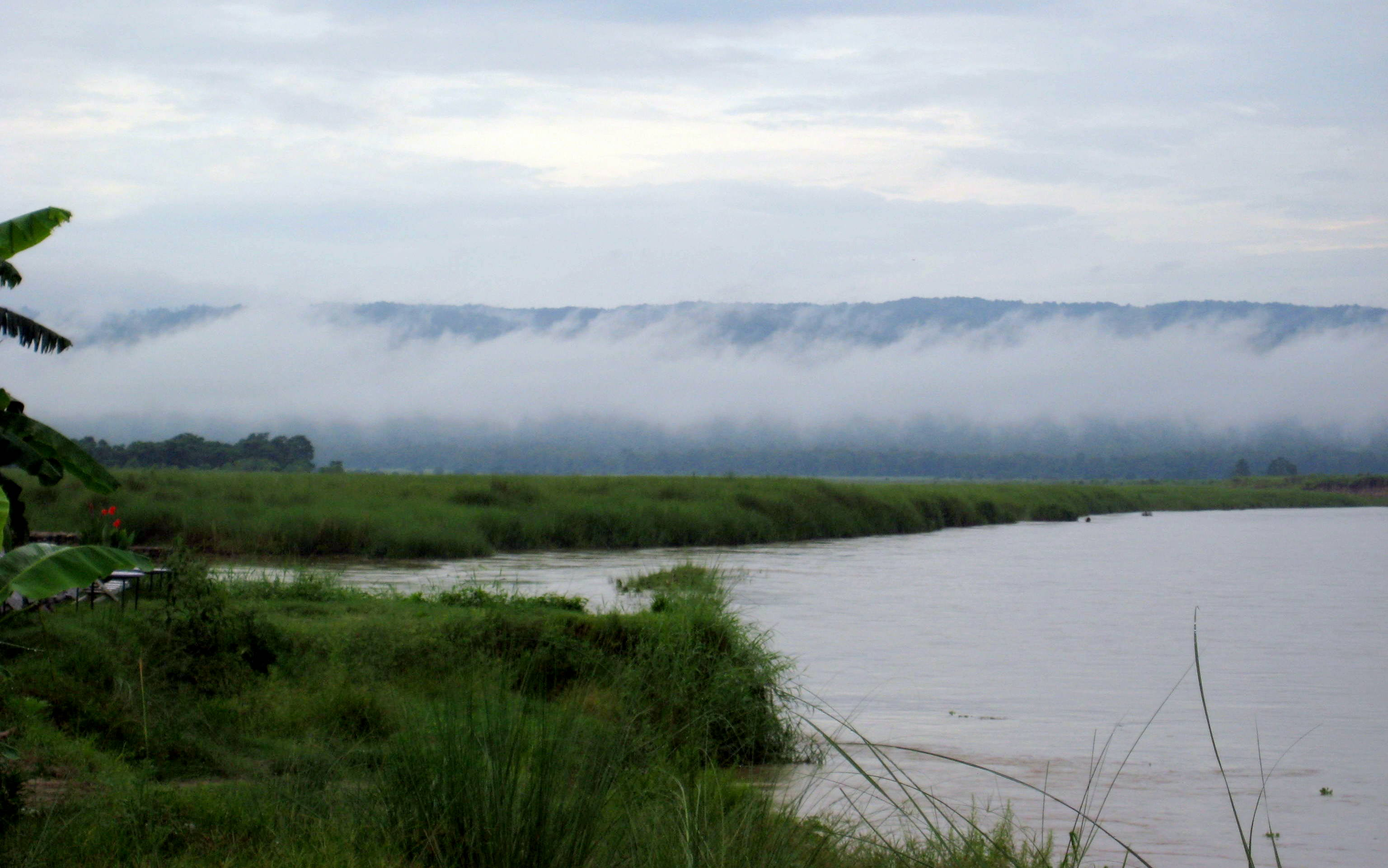
- East Rapti River at early morning, at Sauraha
- Native name: Nepali: पूर्वी राप्ती नदी

Physical characteristics
- Source
  - location: Mahabharat Range
- Mouth
  - location: Narayani River

Basin features
- River system: Ganges
- Tributaries
  - left: Samari, Karra, Kukhreni, Reu, Panchnad
  - right: Lothther, Manahari

The East Rapti River flows from east to west through the Chitwan Valley in Nepal, forming the northern border of the Chitwan National Park. It joins the Narayani River inside the protected area.

== See also ==
- Karra River
- Kushmanda Sarowar Triveni Dham
- Rapti River
- Narayani River
