= The Soul of the Rhino =

- Cover of US edition
- Author: by Hemanta Mishra, with Jim Ottaway Jr.; With forewords by Bruce Babbitt and Jim Fowler
- Cover artist: Claire Zoghb
- Language: English
- Subject: rhinoceros, Nepal, endangered species, conservation
- Publisher: The Lyons Press
- Publication date: January 1, 2008
- Publication place: United States
- Media type: Print (Hardcover)
- Pages: 256
- ISBN: 978-1-59921-146-6
- OCLC: 167499336
- Dewey Decimal: 333.95/16092 B 22
- LC Class: QL31.M63 A3 2008

The Soul of the Rhino is a book about a Nepali adventure with kings and elephant drivers, billionaires and bureaucrats, shamans and scientists, and the Indian Rhinoceros.

== Overview ==
In early 2006, National Public Radio reported that "A promising conservation effort to save one of Nepal's signature endangered species is now in serious trouble, due primarily to poachers taking advantage of fighting between government forces and Maoist insurgents." This was devastating news indeed to author and scientist Hemanta Mishra, who has spent the better part of his adult life struggling to save the Indian Rhino from extinction in his native Nepal.

The Soul of the Rhino is the spirited yet humble account of Mishra's unique personal journey. Fresh out of university in the 1970s, Mishra embarks on his conservation work with the help of an ornery but steadfast elephant driver, the Nepalese royal family, and handfuls of like-minded scientists whose aim is to protect the animal in the foothills of the Himalayas. Yet, in spite of decades spent creating nature reserves and moving rhinos to protected areas, arm-wrestling politicians, and raising awareness for the cause, Mishra is still fearful about the future of the Indian Rhino. To this day, Nepal is overrun by armed insurgents, political violence, and poachers who could kill off this magnificent creature for good.

Filled with candor and bittersweet humor, Mishra re-creates his journey on behalf of the rhino, an ugly yet enchanting, terrifying yet delicate creature. The first book of its kind to delve into the multilayered political labyrinths of South Asian wildlife conservation, and one man's endurance in the face of it all, The Soul of the Rhino is sure to win over your heart and soul.

== Chapters ==
- Foreword by Bruce Babbitt
- Foreword by Jim Fowler
- Preface

1. Close Encounters with the Unicorn Kind
2. Cheating Yama, the God of Death
3. A Tale of the Terai
4. Rhino Roots
5. Clash of Cultures
6. Medicine or Myth?
7. Learning from the West
8. Wilderness Blues
9. Poverty, Rhinos, Tigers, and Tourists in Chitwan
10. George of the Jungle
11. Killing Mothers to Snatch Babies

12. Science and Shamanism
13. Kidnapping Baby Rhinos for an American Zoo
14. Taming Texas Rhinos
15. Popes, Kings, Queens, and the Rhino
16. Palace Intrigues
17. Rookie at the Royal Rhino Hunt
18. Rhino Versus Royalty
19. Prayers in the Dusk
20. Moving Rhinos
21. A New Home for the Rhinos

- Epilogue: Hope or Uncertainty on a Himalayan Scale
- Selected Bibliography
- Index
- The Explorers Club History and Mission Statement

== See also ==
Indian rhinoceros

Nepal
