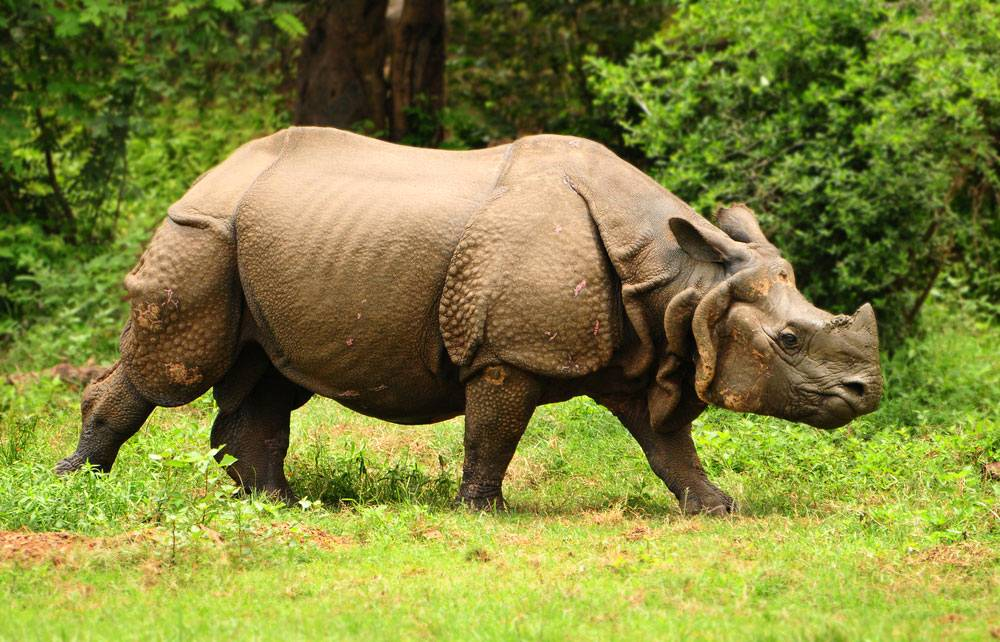
- In Kaziranga National Park

Conservation status
- Vulnerable (IUCN 3.1)
- CITES Appendix I

Scientific classification
- Kingdom: Animalia
- Phylum: Chordata
- Class: Mammalia
- Order: Perissodactyla
- Family: Rhinocerotidae
- Genus: Rhinoceros
- Species: R. unicornis

Binomial name
- Rhinoceros unicornis Linnaeus, 1758
- Current distribution Natural distribution Reintroduced
- Historical distribution (from around 1500)

= Indian rhinoceros =

Indian rhinoceros Temporal range: Early Pleistocene–Recent

Species of rhinoceros

The Indian rhinoceros (Rhinoceros unicornis), also known as the greater one-horned rhinoceros, great Indian rhinoceros or Indian rhino, is a rhinoceros species native to the Indian subcontinent. It is the second largest living rhinoceros and the largest in Asia, with adult males weighing 2.07–2.2 t (2.04–2.17 long tons; 2.28–2.43 short tons) and adult females 1.6 t (1.6 long tons; 1.8 short tons). Its thick skin is grey-brown with pinkish skin folds and it has a single horn on its snout that grows up to 57.2–61.6 cm (22.5–24.3 in) long. Its upper legs and shoulders are covered in wart-like bumps, and it is nearly hairless aside from the eyelashes, ear fringes and tail brush.

The Indian rhinoceros occurs in the Indo-Gangetic Plain in 12 protected areas in northern India and southern Nepal. It is a grazer, eating mainly grass, but also twigs, leaves, branches, shrubs, flowers, fruits and aquatic plants. It is a largely solitary animal, only associating in the breeding season and when rearing calves. Females give birth to a single calf after a gestation of 15.7 months, and the birth interval is 34–51 months. Captive individuals can live up to 47 years. It is susceptible to diseases such as anthrax, and those caused by parasites such as leeches, ticks and nematodes.

The Indian rhinoceros is listed as vulnerable on the IUCN Red List, as the population is fragmented and restricted to less than 20,000 km^{2} (7,700 sq mi). Excessive hunting and agricultural development reduced its range drastically. In the early 1990s, the global population was estimated at between 1,870 and 1,895 individuals. Since then, the population increased due to conservation measures taken by the governments. As of March 2025, it was estimated to comprise 4,075 individuals. However, poaching remains a continuous threat.

== Etymology ==
The generic name rhinoceros is derived through Latin from the Ancient Greek: ῥινόκερως, which is composed of ῥινο- (rhino-, "of the nose") and κέρας (keras, "horn") with a horn on the nose. The name has been in use since the 14th century. The Latin word ūnicornis means "one-horned".

== Taxonomy ==
Rhinoceros unicornis was the scientific name used by Carl Linnaeus in 1758 who described a rhinoceros with one horn. As type locality, he indicated Africa and India.

The Indian rhinoceros is a monotypic taxon. Several zoological specimens were described since the end of the 18th century under different scientific names, which are all considered synonyms of Rhinoceros unicornis today:

- R. indicus by Cuvier, 1817
- R. asiaticus by Blumenbach, 1830
- R. stenocephalus by Gray, 1867
- R. jamrachi by Sclater, 1876
- R. bengalensis by Kourist, 1970

=== Evolution ===
Ancestral rhinoceroses first diverged from other perissodactyls in the Early Eocene. Mitochondrial DNA comparison suggests the ancestors of modern rhinos split from the ancestors of Equidae around 50 million years ago. The extant family, the Rhinocerotidae, first appeared in the Late Eocene in Eurasia, and the ancestors of the extant rhino species dispersed from Asia beginning in the Miocene. The last common ancestor of living rhinoceroses belonging to the subfamily Rhinocerotinae is suggested to have lived around 16 million years ago, with the ancestors of the genus Rhinoceros diverging from the ancestors of other living rhinoceroses around 15 million years ago. The genus Rhinoceros has been found to be overall slightly more closely related to the Sumatran rhinoceros (as well as to the extinct woolly rhinoceros and the extinct Eurasian genus Stephanorhinus) than to living African rhinoceroses, though there appears to have been gene flow between the ancestors of living African rhinoceroses and the genus Rhinoceros, as well as between the ancestors of the genus Rhinoceros and the ancestors of the woolly rhinoceros and Stephanorhinus.

A cladogram showing the relationships of recent and Late Pleistocene rhinoceros species (minus Stephanorhinus hemitoechus) based on whole nuclear genomes, after Liu et al., 2021:

- - Elasmotheriinae
    †Elasmotherium sibiricum
  - Rhinocerotinae
    - - White Rhinoceros (Ceratotherium simum)
      - Black rhinoceros (Diceros bicornis)
    - - - - † Woolly rhinoceros (Coelodonta antiquitatis)
          - † Merck's rhinoceros (Stephanorhinus kirchbergensis)
        - Sumatran rhinoceros (Dicerorhinus sumatrensis)
      - - Javan rhinoceros (Rhinoceros sondaicus)
        - Indian rhinoceros (Rhinoceros unicornis)

The earliest fossils of the genus Rhinoceros date to the Late Miocene, around 9 to 8 million years ago. The divergence between the Indian and Javan rhinoceros is estimated to have occurred around 4.3 million years ago. The earliest representatives of the modern Indian rhinoceros appeared during the Early Pleistocene at 2.6 to 0.8 million years ago; fossils indicate that the Indian rhinoceros during the Pleistocene also inhabited areas considerably further east of its current distribution, including mainland Southeast Asia, South China and the island of Java, Indonesia. They also appear to have ranged as far south as Tamil Nadu in India, based on subfossil remains as recent as the Neolithic. A Late Pleistocene partial fossil skeleton of R. unicornis was described from Kanchanaburi province in Thailand in 2018.

Several fossil Rhinoceros species from South Asia, such as R. palaeindicus and R. sivalensis from the Late Pliocene or early Pleistocene of Nahan, R. deccanensis from the Pleistocene of Karnataka and R. namadicus from the Pleistocene of Madhya Pradesh are potentially synonymous with R. unicornis.

== Characteristics ==
The Indian rhinoceros has a thick grey-brown skin with pinkish skin folds and one horn on its snout. Its upper legs and shoulders are covered in wart-like bumps. It has very little body hair, aside from eyelashes, ear fringes and tail brush. Bulls have huge neck folds. The skull is heavy with a basal length above 60 cm (24 in) and an occiput above 19 cm (7.5 in). The nasal horn is slightly back-curved with a base of about 18.5 cm (7.3 in) by 12 cm (4.7 in) that rapidly narrows until a smooth, even stem part begins about 55 mm (2.2 in) above base. In captive animals, the horn is frequently worn down to a thick knob. The Indian rhino's single horn is present in both bulls and cows, but not on newborn calves. The horn consists of pure keratin and starts to show after about six years. In most adults, the horn reaches a length of about 25 cm (9.8 in), but has been recorded up to 57.2 cm (22.5 in) to 61.6 cm (24.3 in) in length and 3.051 kg (6.73 lb) in weight.

The bull has a head and body length of 368–380 cm (12.07–12.47 ft), a shoulder height of 163–193 cm (64–76 in) and averages about 2,070–2,200 kg (4,560–4,850 lb); the cow has a head and body length of 310–340 cm (10.2–11.2 ft), a shoulder height of 147–173 cm (58–68 in) and weighs about 1,600 kg (3,530 lb). The largest individuals reportedly measured up to 436 cm (14.30 ft) in body length, 206 cm (81 in) in shoulder height and weigh up to 4,000 kg (8,820 lb). The Indian rhinoceros is the second-largest living rhinoceros, after the white rhinoceros. Among terrestrial mammals native to Asia, it is the second in size only to the Asian elephant.

The rich presence of blood vessels underneath the tissues in folds gives them the pinkish colour. The folds in the skin increase the surface area and help in regulating the body temperature. The thick skin does not protect against bloodsucking Tabanus flies, leeches and ticks.

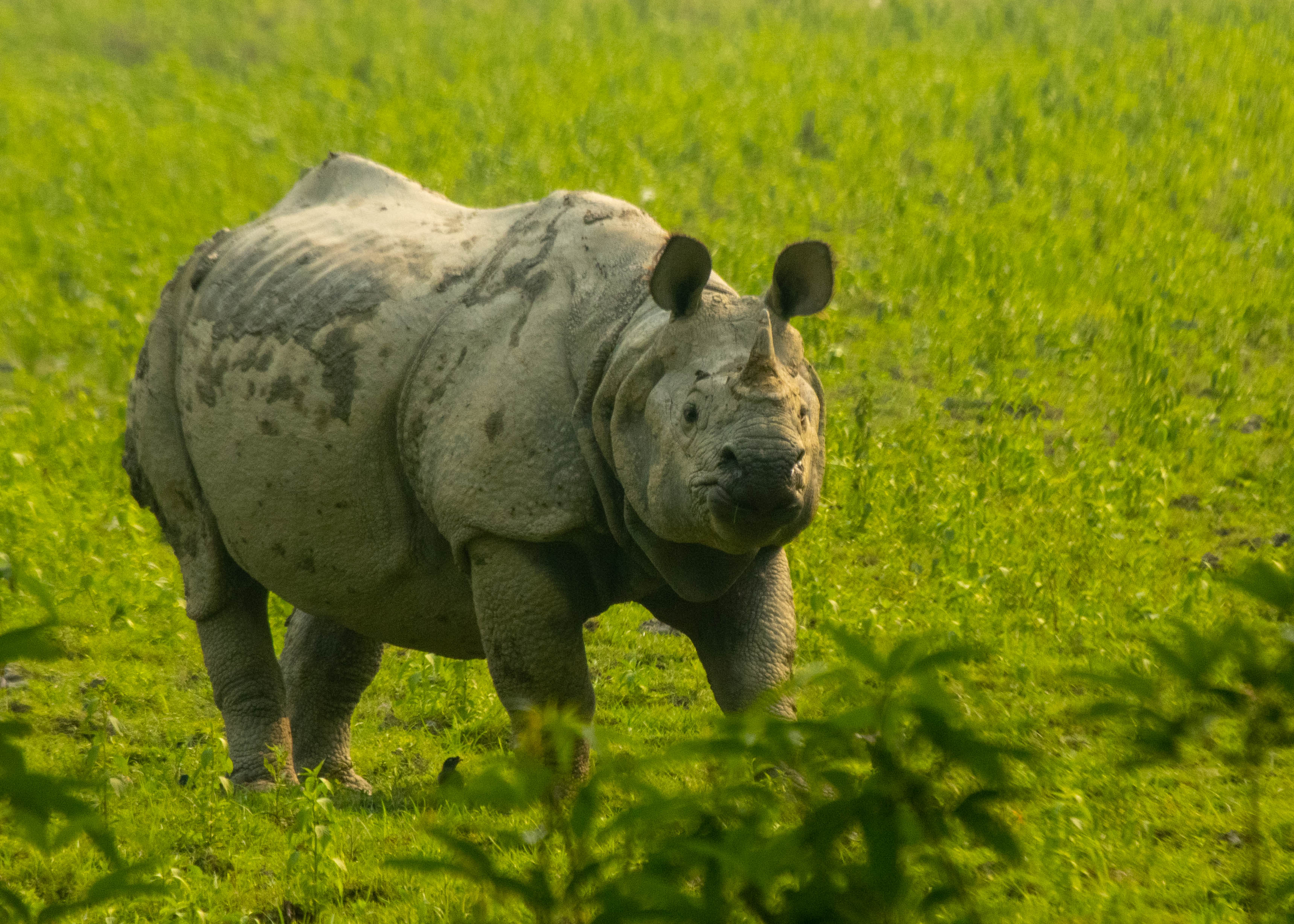
Indian rhinoceros at Kaziranga National Park

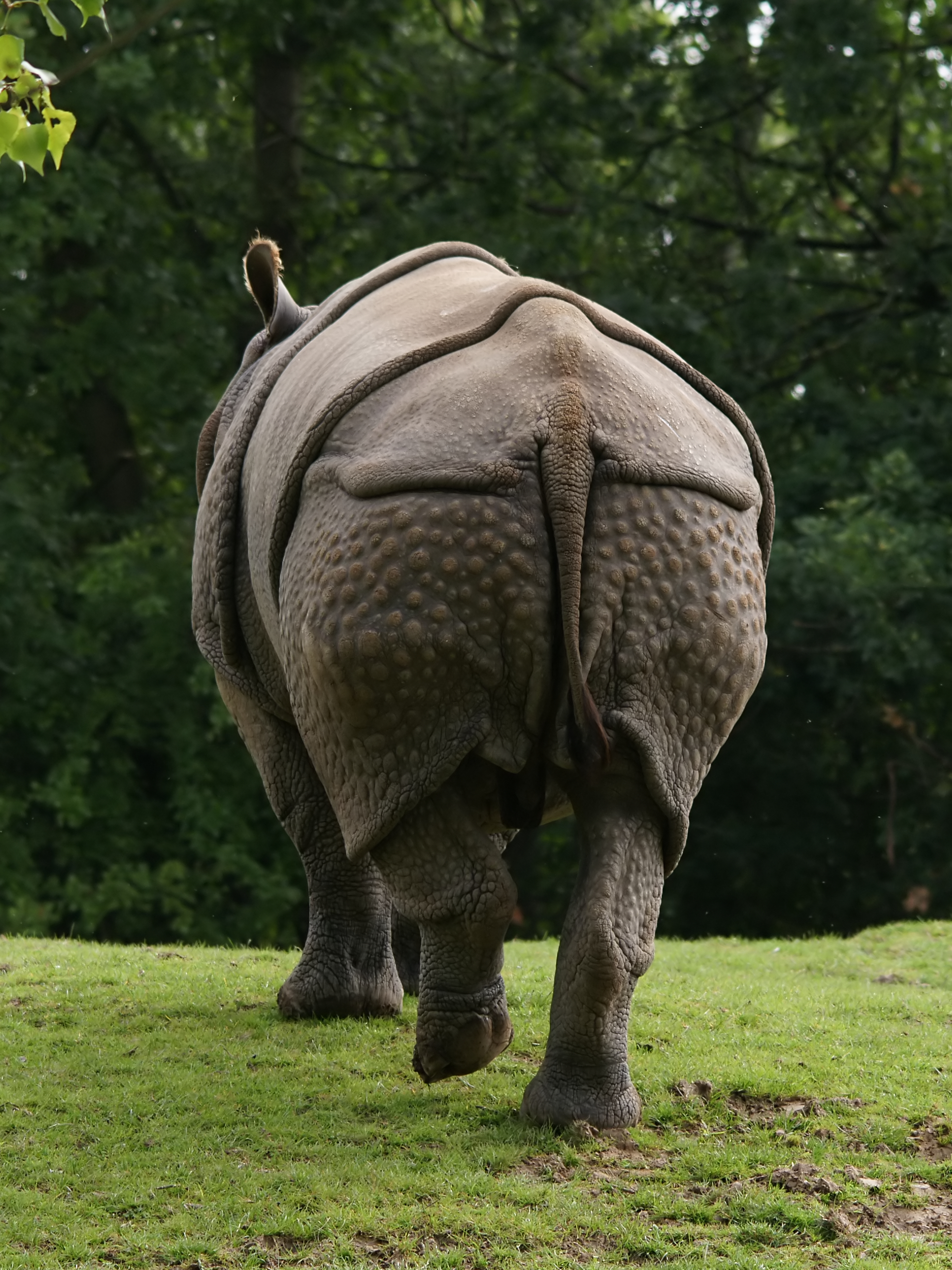
Wart-like bumps on the hind legs

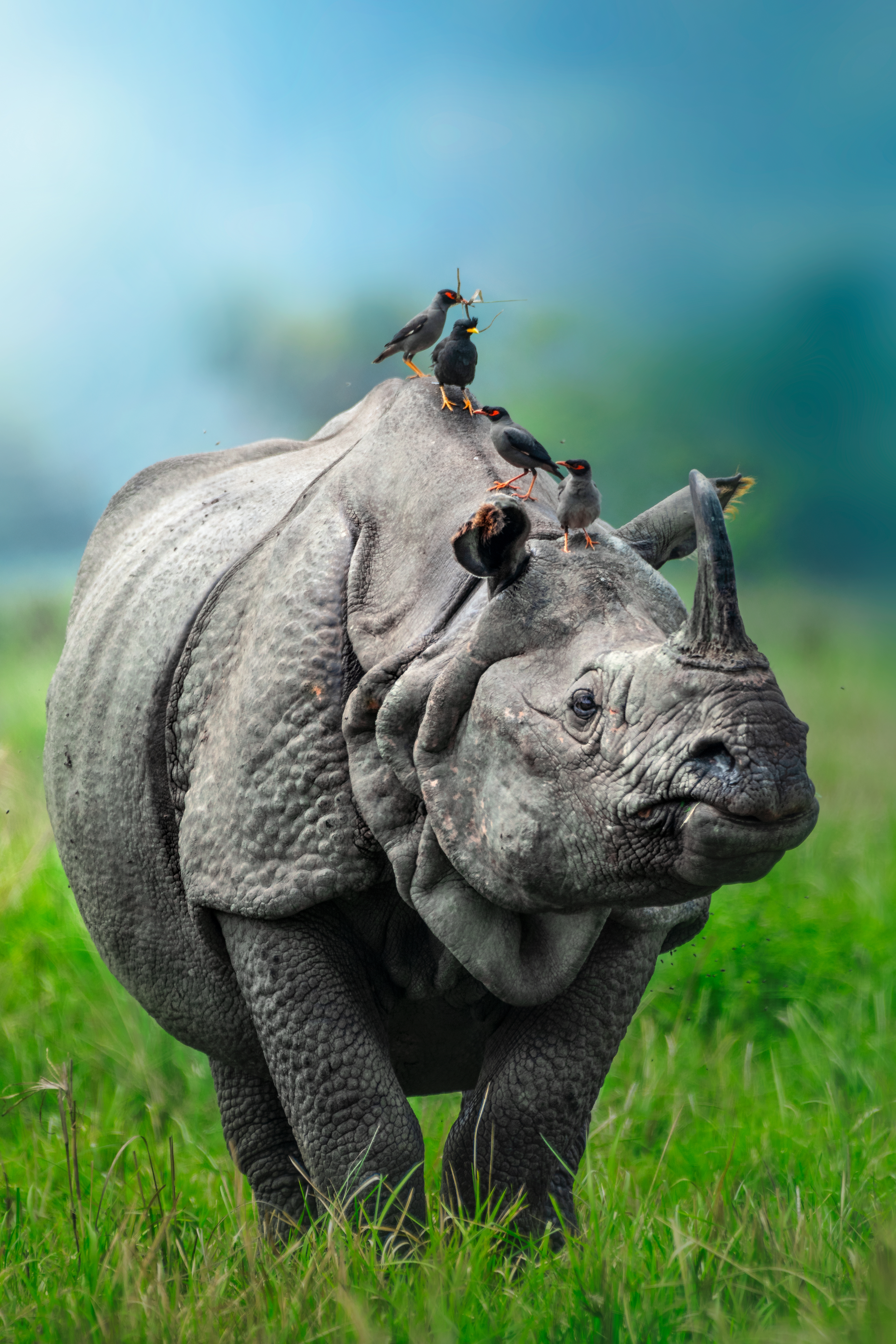
The Indian rhinoceros's single horn

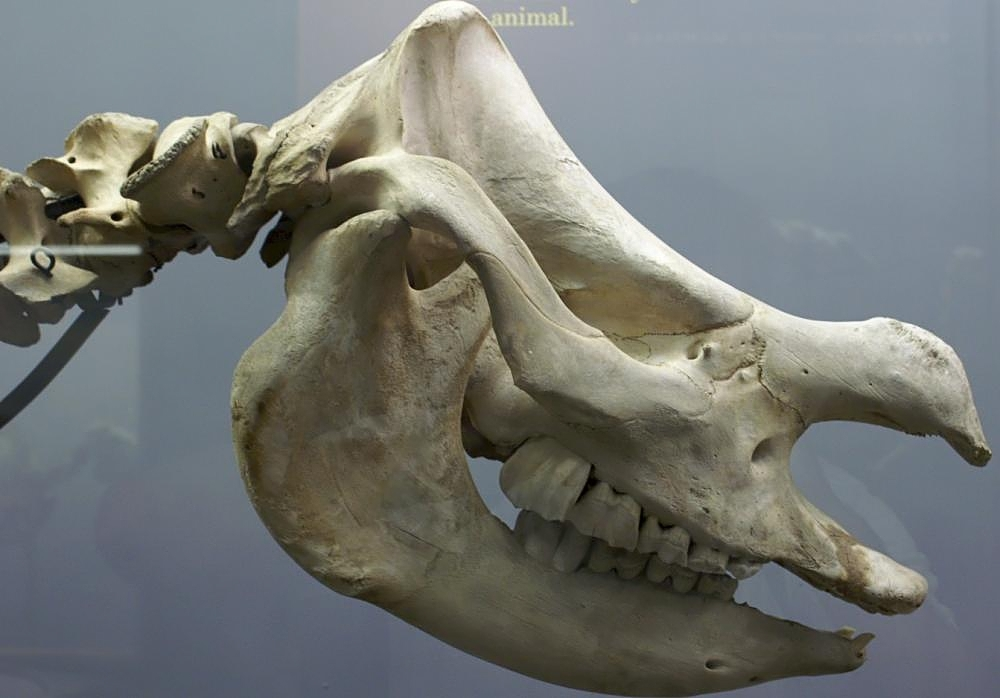
The skull of an Indian rhinoceros

== Distribution and habitat ==
Indian rhino population

Indian rhinos once ranged across the entire northern part of the Indian subcontinent, along the Indus, Ganges and Brahmaputra River basins, from Pakistan to the Indian-Myanmar border, including Bangladesh and the southern parts of Nepal and Bhutan. They may have also occurred in Myanmar, southern China and Indochina. They inhabit the alluvial grasslands of the Terai and the Brahmaputra basin. As a result of habitat destruction and climatic changes its range has gradually been reduced so that by the 19th century, it only survived in the Terai grasslands of southern Nepal, northern Uttar Pradesh, northern Bihar, northern West Bengal, and in the Brahmaputra Valley of Assam.

During the Late Pleistocene, its range extended into Thailand, Vietnam and Laos, and remains of rhinoceroses found in the Pleistocene of southern China, otherwise assigned to the species "Rhinoceros sinensis", may actually represent the Indian rhinoceros. It was present in northern Bihar and Oudh at least until 1770 as indicated in maps produced by Colonel Gentil. On the former abundance of the species, Thomas C. Jerdon wrote in 1867:

This huge rhinoceros is found in the Terai at the foot of the Himalayas, from Bhutan to Nepal. It is more common in the eastern portion of the Terai than the west, and is most abundant in Assam and the Bhutan Dooars. I have heard from sportsmen of its occurrence as far west as Rohilcund, but it is certainly rare there now, and indeed along the greater part of the Nepal Terai; ... Jelpigoree, a small military station near the Teesta River, was a favourite locality whence to hunt the Rhinoceros and it was from that station Captain Fortescue ... got his skulls, which were ... the first that Mr. Blyth had seen of this species, ...

Today, its range has further shrunk to a few pockets in southern Nepal, northern West Bengal, and the Brahmaputra Valley. Its habitat is surrounded by human-dominated landscapes, so that in many areas, it occurs in cultivated areas, pastures, and secondary forests. In the 1980s, Indian rhinos were frequently seen in the narrow plain area of Manas River and Royal Manas National Park in Bhutan.

=== Populations ===
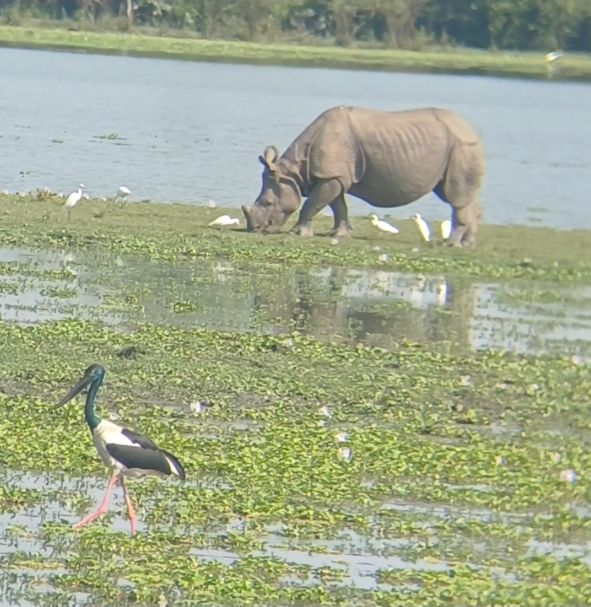
Kaziranga National Park

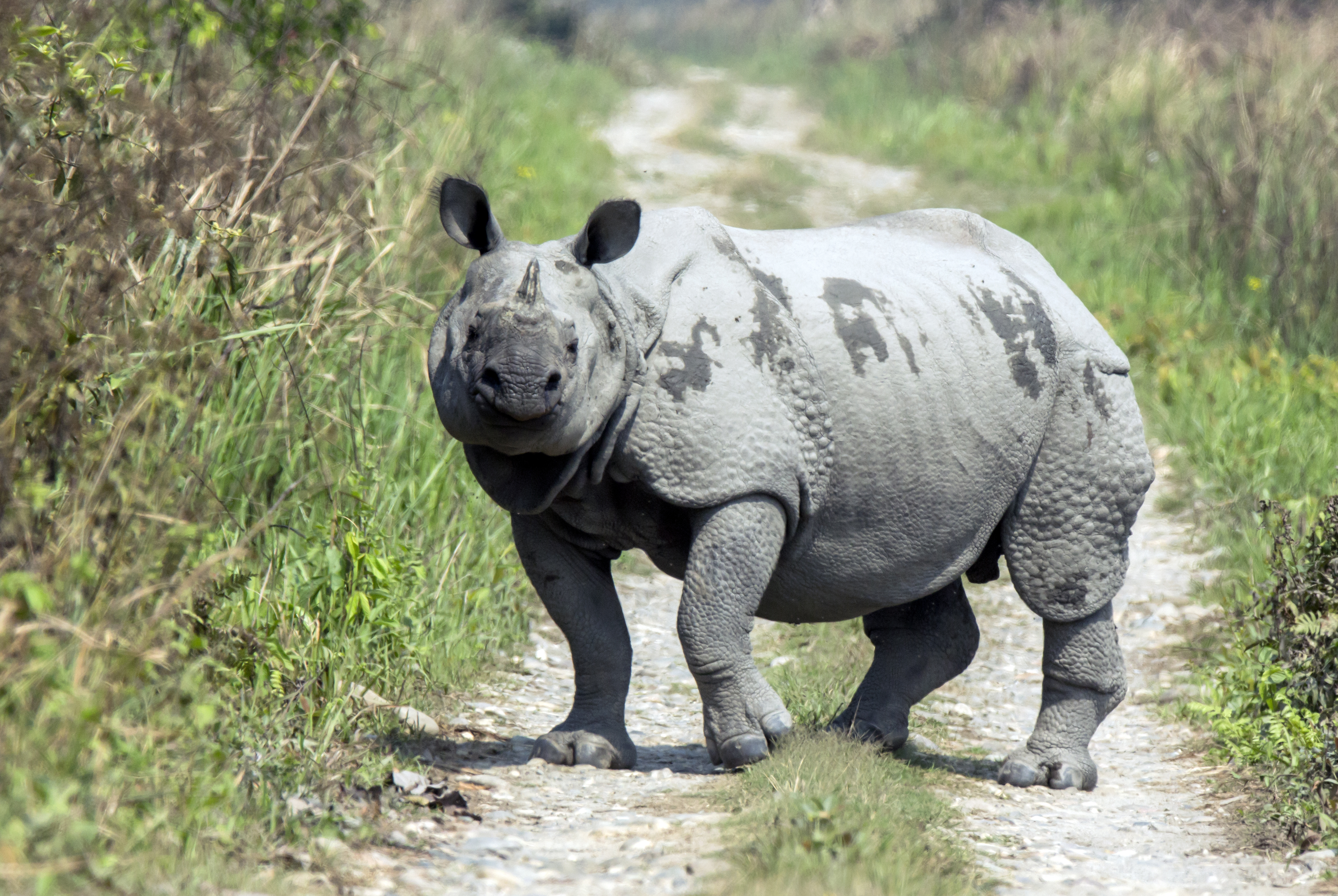
Indian rhinoceros in Manas National Park, Assam

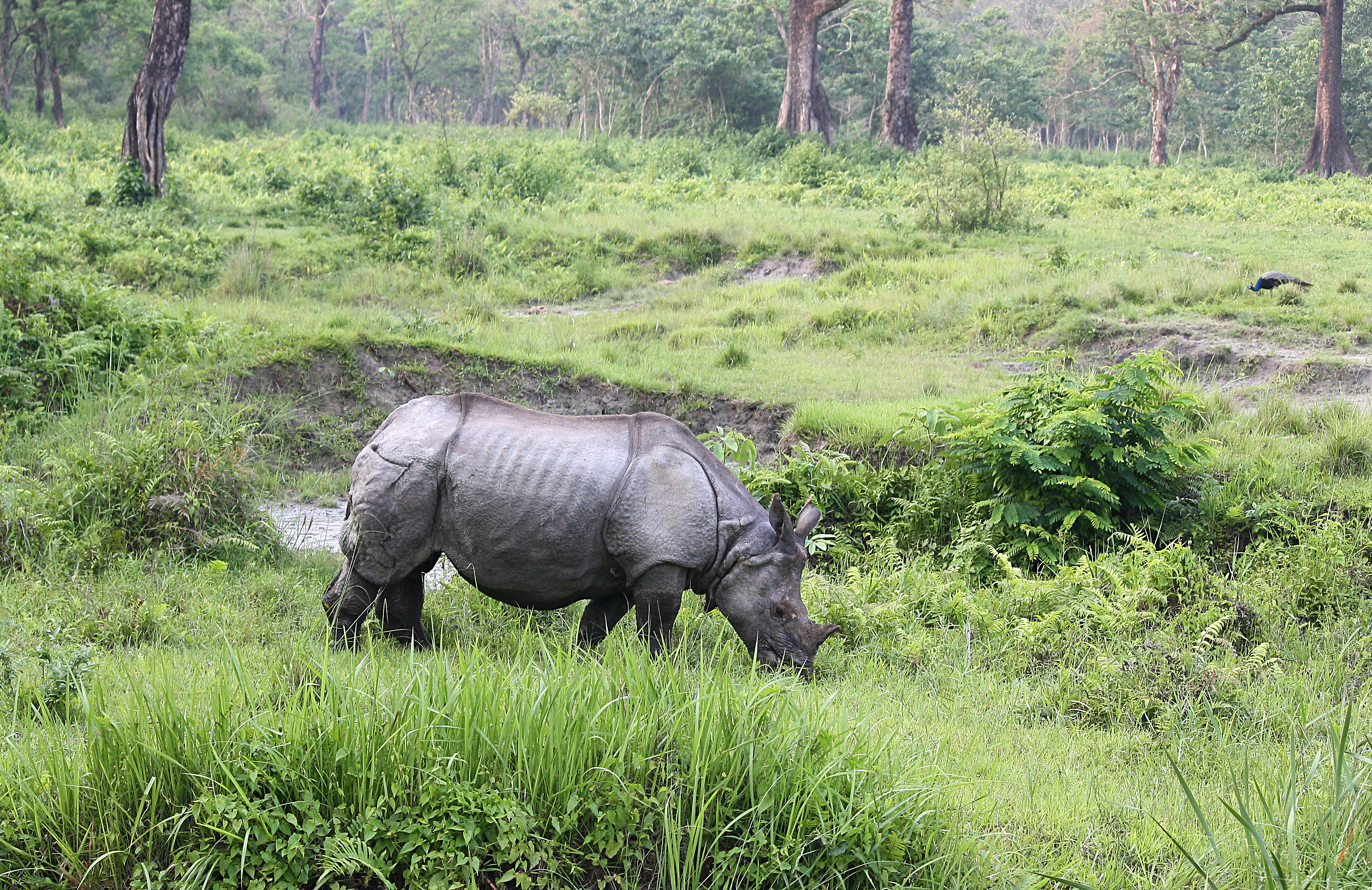
Rhino at Jaldapara National Park, West Bengal

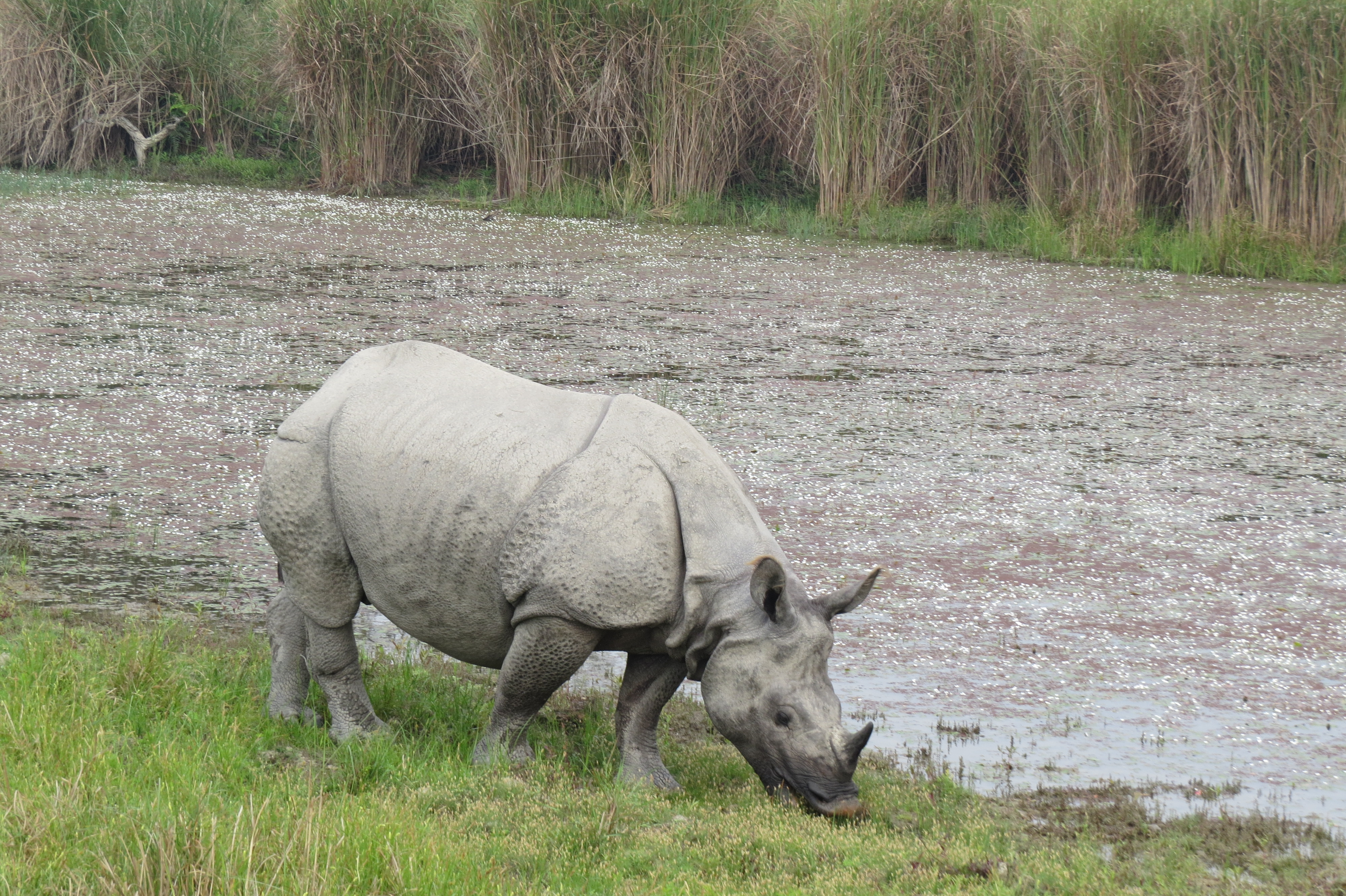
Rhino in Dudhwa National Park, Uttar Pradesh

In 2022, the total Indian rhinoceros population was estimated to be 4,014 individuals, up from 2,577 in 2006. Among them, 3,262 are in India and the remaining 752 are in Nepal and Bhutan. There is no permanent rhino population in Bhutan, but small rhino populations are occasionally known to cross from the Manas National Park or Buxa Tiger Reserve in India.

As of 2008, there were around 2,885 individuals in Assam including 2,613 in Kaziranga National Park, 125 in Orang National Park, 107 in Pobitora Wildlife Sanctuary and 40 in Manas National Park. West Bengal had a population of 339 individuals, including 287 in Jaldapara National Park and 52 in Gorumara National Park. Only 38 individuals lived in Dudhwa National Park.

By 2014, the population in Assam increased to 2,544 Indian rhinos, an increase of 27% since 2006, although more than 150 individuals were killed by poachers during these years. The population in Kaziranga National Park was estimated at 2,048 individuals in 2009. By 2009, the population in Pobitora Wildlife Sanctuary had increased to 84 individuals in an area of 38.80 km^{2} (14.98 sq mi).

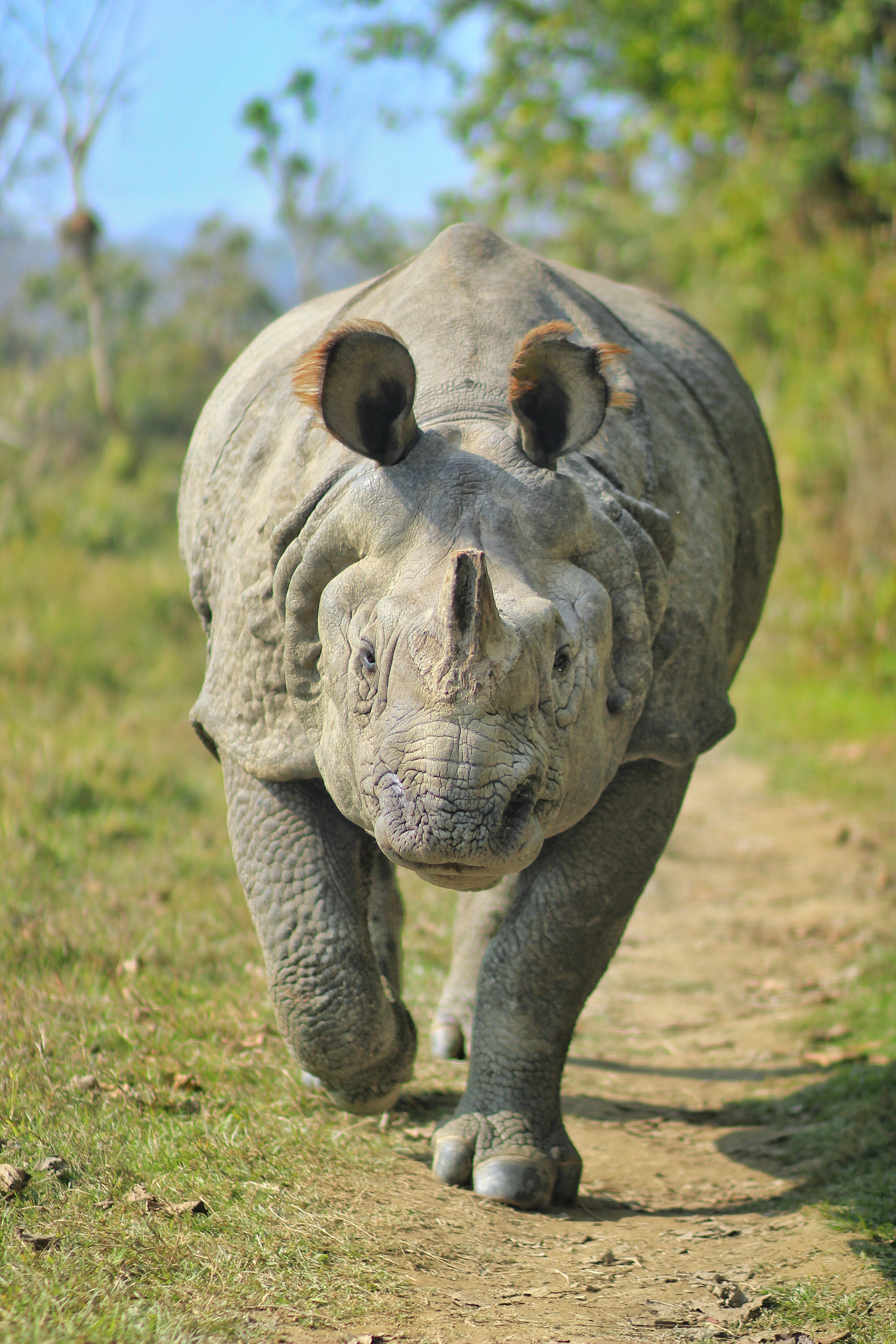
Indian rhinoceros in Chitwan National Park, Nepal

In 2015, Nepal had 645 Indian rhinos living in Parsa National Park, Chitwan National Park, Bardia National Park, Shuklaphanta National Park and respective buffer zones in the Terai Arc Landscape as recorded in a survey conducted from 11 April to 2 May 2015. The survey showed that the population of rhinos in Nepal from 2011 to 2015 increased 21% or 111 individuals.

The Indian rhino population, which once numbered as low as 100 individuals in the early 1900s, has increased to more than 3,700 as of 2021. According to a population census conducted in late March 2025, the estimated population is 4,075, with 3,323 in India and 752 in Nepal.

== Ecology and behaviour ==
Bulls are usually solitary. Groups consist of cows with calves, or of up to six subadults. Such groups congregate at wallows and grazing areas. They are foremost active in early mornings, late afternoons and at night, but rest during hot days. They bathe regularly. The folds in their skin trap water and hold it even when they exit wallows. They are excellent swimmers and can run at speeds of up to 55 km/h (34 mph) for short periods. They have excellent senses of hearing and smell, but relatively poor eyesight. Over 10 distinct vocalisations have been recorded. Males have home ranges of around 2 to 8 km^{2} (0.77 to 3.09 sq mi) that overlap each other. Dominant males tolerate other males passing through their territories except when they are in mating season, when dangerous fights break out.

Indian rhinos have few natural enemies, except for tigers, which sometimes kill unguarded calves, but adult rhinos are less vulnerable due to their size. Mynahs and egrets both eat invertebrates from the rhino's skin and around its feet. Tabanus flies, a type of horse-fly, are known to bite rhinos. The rhinos are also vulnerable to diseases spread by parasites such as leeches, ticks, nematodes and flatworms like Bivitellobilharzia nairi. Anthrax and the blood-disease sepsis are known to occur.

In March 2017, a group of four tigers consisting of an adult male, tigress and two cubs killed a 20-year-old male Indian rhinoceros in Dudhwa Tiger Reserve. Such cases are rare, as Indian rhinoceroses are not vulnerable to predation.

=== Diet ===
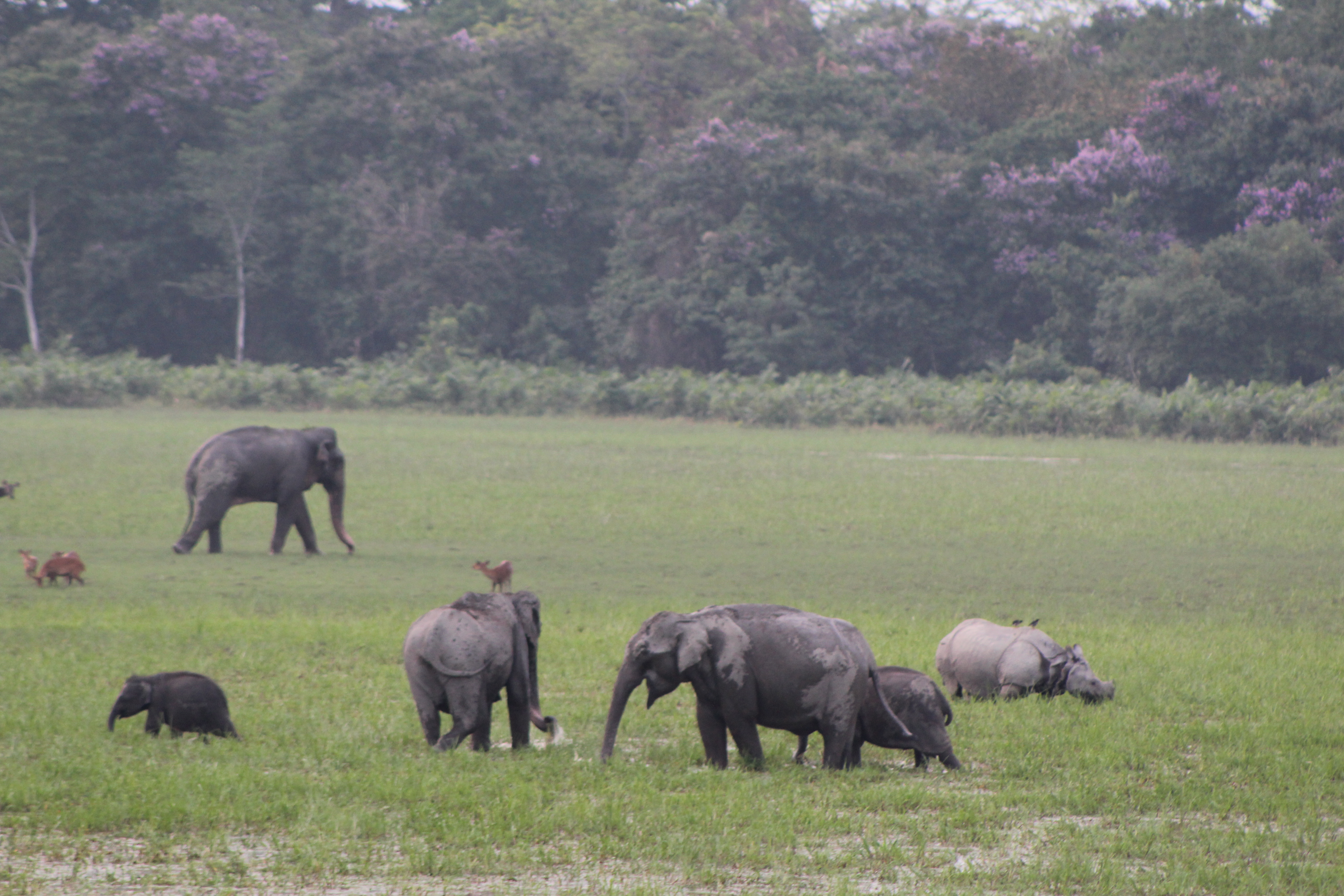
Rhino and elephant grazing

The Indian rhino is a grazer. Its diet consists almost entirely of grasses (such as Arundo donax, Bambusa tulda, Cynodon dactylon, and Oryza sativa), but it also eat leaves, twigs and branches of shrubs and trees such as Lagerstroemia indica, flowers, fruits such as Ficus religiosa, and submerged and floating aquatic plants. It feeds in the mornings and evenings. It uses its semi-prehensile lip to grasp grass stems, bend the stem down, bite off the top, and then eat the grass. It tackles very tall grasses or saplings by walking over the plant, with legs on both sides and using the weight of its body to push the end of the plant down to the level of the mouth. Mothers also use this technique to make food edible for their calves. They drink for a minute or two at a time, often imbibing water filled with rhinoceros urine.

=== Social life ===
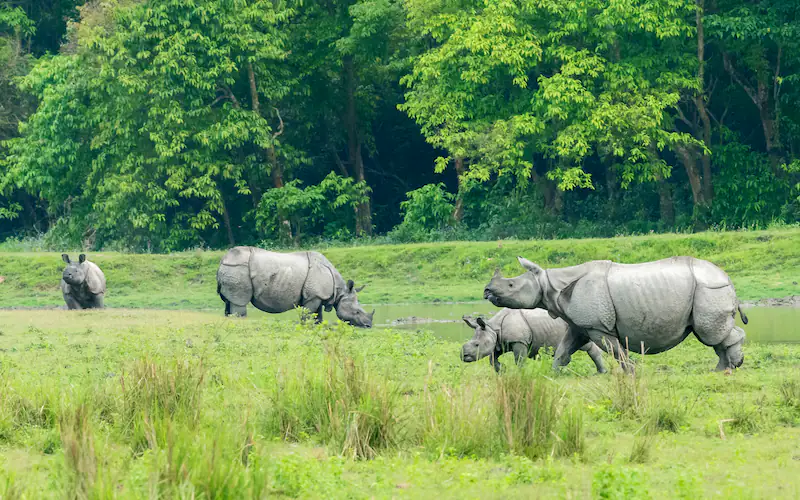
Rhino in Kaziranga National Park

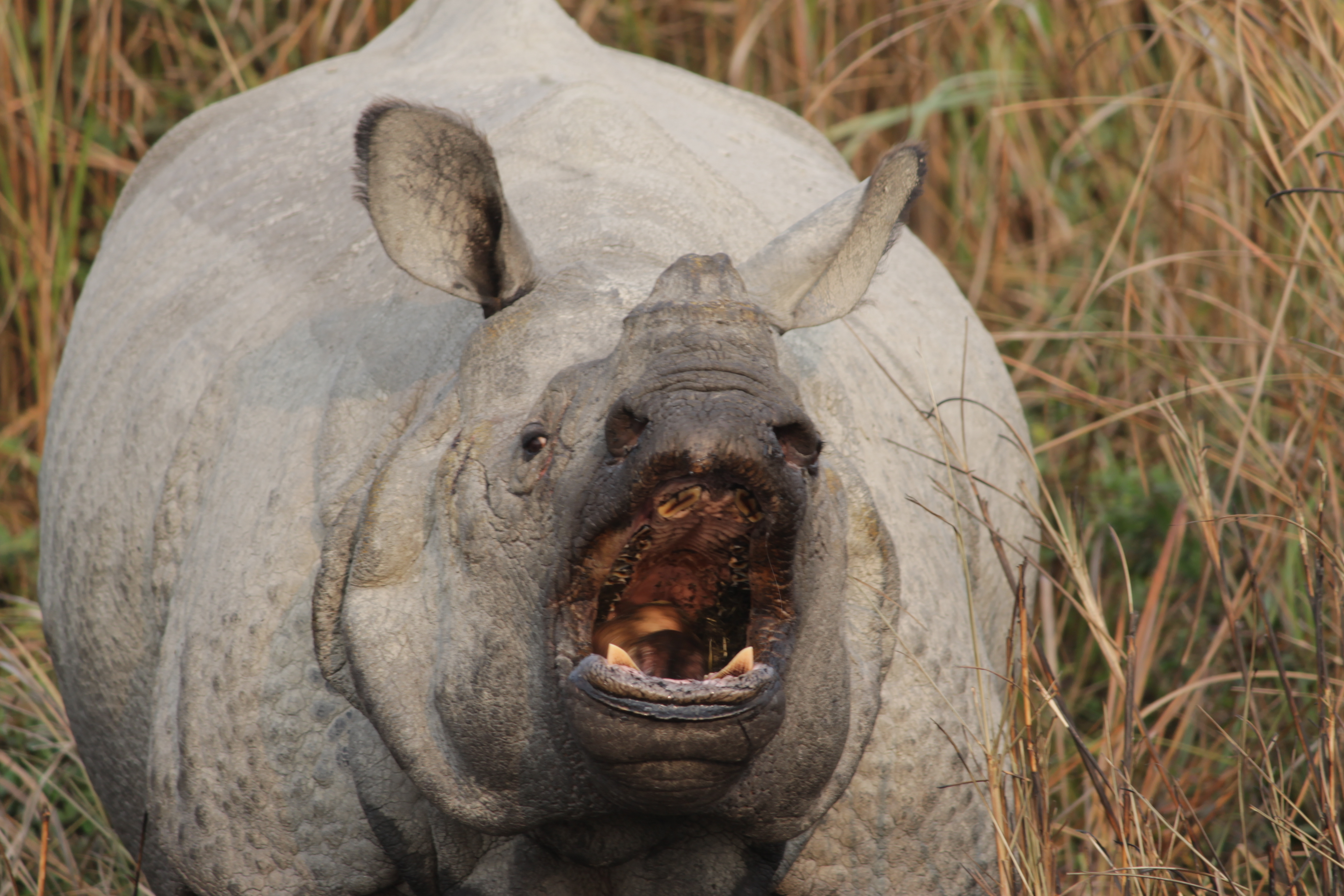
Indian rhinoceros showing its sharp lower incisor teeth used for fighting

Indian rhinos form a variety of social groupings. Bulls are generally solitary, except for mating and fighting. Cows are largely solitary when they are without calves. Mothers will stay close to their calves for up to four years after their birth, sometimes allowing an older calf to continue to accompany her once a newborn calf arrives. Subadult bulls and cows form consistent groupings, as well. Groups of two or three young bulls often form on the edge of the home ranges of dominant bulls, presumably for protection in numbers. Young cows are slightly less social than the bulls. Indian rhinos also form short-term groupings, particularly at forest wallows during the monsoon season and in grasslands during March and April. Groups of up to 10 rhinos, typically a dominant male with females and calves, gather in wallows.

Indian rhinos make a wide variety of vocalisations. At least 10 distinct vocalisations have been identified: snorting, honking, bleating, roaring, squeak-panting, moo-grunting, shrieking, groaning, rumbling and humphing. In addition to noises, the Indian rhino uses olfactory communication. Adult bulls urinate backwards, as far as 3–4 m (9.8–13.1 ft) behind them, often in response to being disturbed by observers. Like all rhinos, the Indian rhinoceros often defecates near other large dung piles. The Indian rhino has pedal scent glands which are used to mark their presence at these rhino latrines. Bulls have been observed walking with their heads to the ground as if sniffing, presumably following the scent of cows.

In aggregations, Indian rhinos are often friendly. They will often greet each other by waving or bobbing their heads, mounting flanks, nuzzling noses, or licking. Indian rhinos will playfully spar, run around, and play with twigs in their mouths. Adult bulls are the primary instigators in fights. Fights between dominant bulls are the most common cause of rhino mortality, and bulls are also very aggressive toward cows during courtship. Bulls chase cows over long distances and even attack them face-to-face. Indian rhinos use their horns for fighting, albeit less frequently than African rhinos, largely using the incisors of the lower jaw to inflict wounds.

=== Reproduction ===
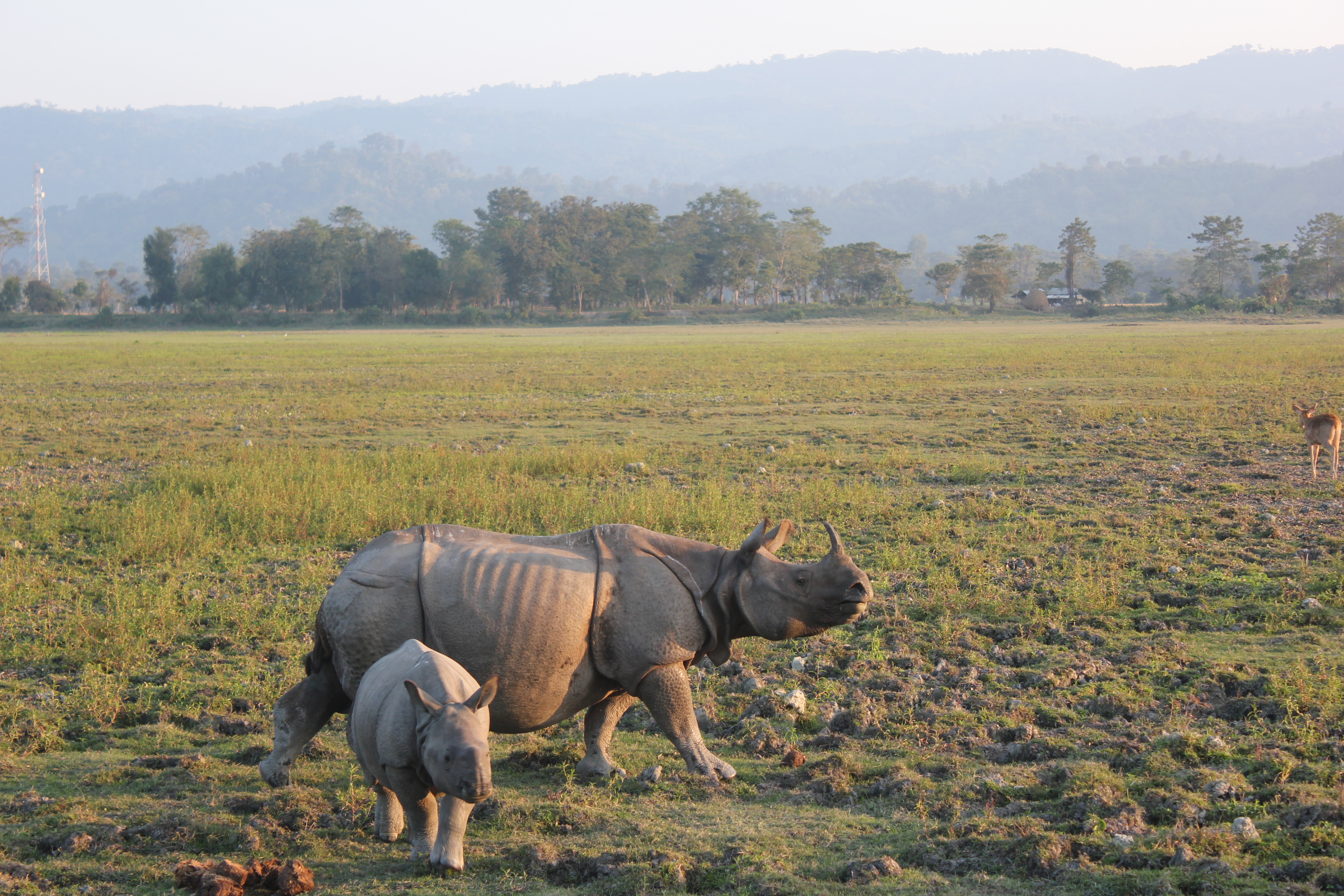
Indian rhino cow with calf

Captive bulls breed at five years of age, but wild bulls attain dominance much later when they are larger. In one five-year field study, only one Indian rhino estimated to be younger than 15 years mated successfully. Captive cows breed as young as four years of age, but in the wild, they usually start breeding only when six years old, which likely indicates they need to be large enough to avoid being killed by aggressive bulls. In the wild, females reach full maturity at about 6.5 years, and males at about 10 years. The ovarian cycle lasts 5.5 to 9 weeks on average. Their gestation period is around 15.7 months, and birth interval ranges from 34 to 51 months. An estimated 10% of calves will die before maturity. This is mainly attributed to predatory attacks from tigers (Panthera tigris). In captivity, four Indian rhinos lived over 40 years, the oldest living to be 47.

== Threats ==
Habitat degradation caused by human activities and climate change as well as the resulting increase in the floods has caused many Indian rhino deaths and has limited their ranging areas which is shrinking.

Serious declines in quality of habitat have occurred in some areas, due to severe invasion by alien plants into grasslands affecting some populations, and demonstrated reductions in the extent of grasslands and wetland habitats due to woodland encroachment and silting up of beels (swampy wetlands). Grazing by domestic livestock is another cause.

The Indian rhino species is inherently at risk because over 70% of its population occurs at a single site, Kaziranga National Park. Any catastrophic event such as disease, civil disorder, poaching, or habitat loss would have a devastating impact on the Indian rhino's status. Additionally, a small population of rhinos may be prone to inbreeding depression.

=== Poaching ===
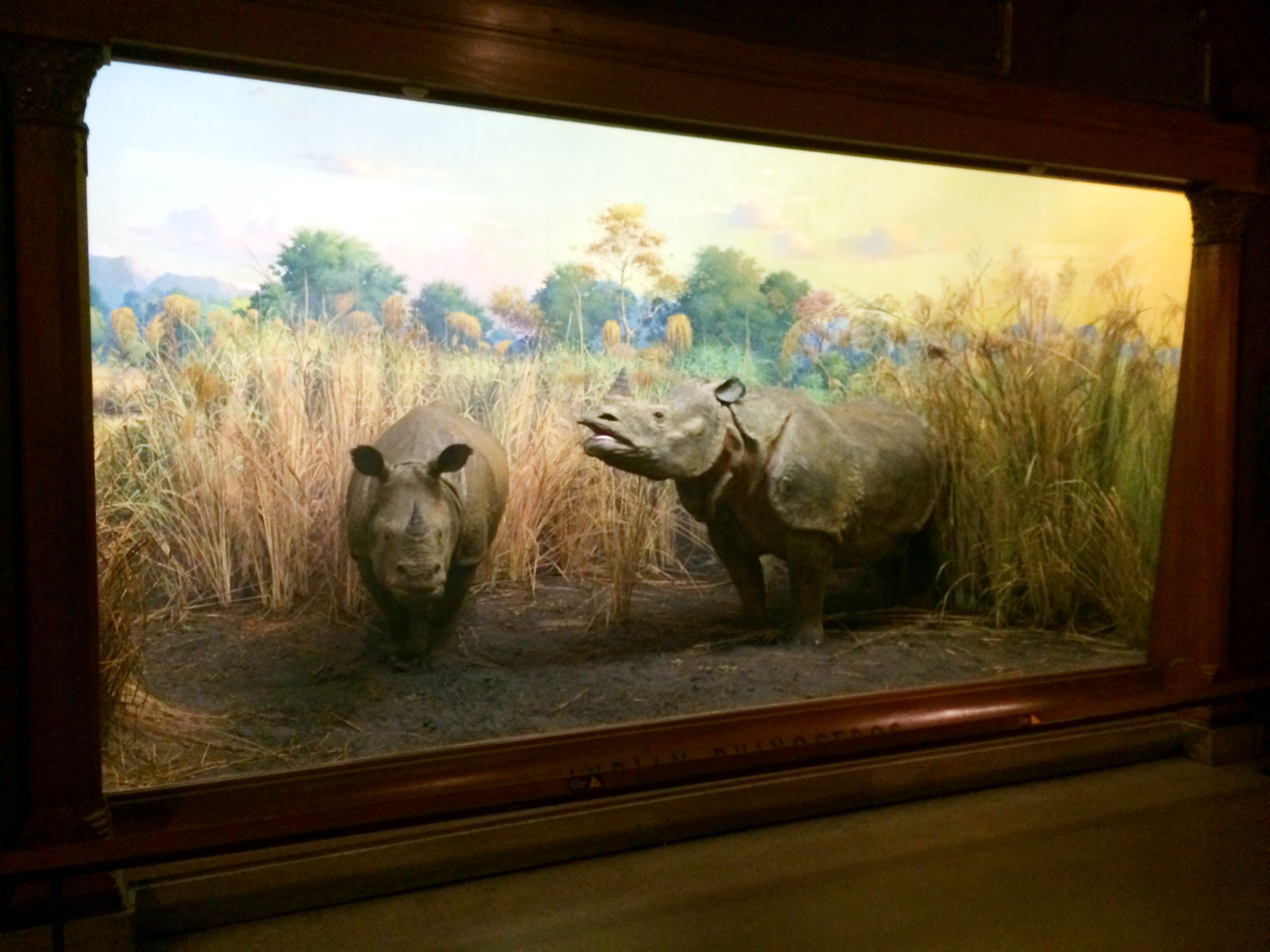
Taxidermied specimens, American Museum of Natural History

Sport hunting became common in the late 19th and early 20th centuries and was the main cause for the decline of Indian rhinoceros populations. Indian rhinos were hunted relentlessly and persistently. Reports from the mid-19th century claim that some British military officers shot more than 200 rhinos in Assam alone. By 1908, the population in Kaziranga National Park had decreased to around 12 individuals. In the early 1900s, the Indian rhinoceros was almost extinct. At present, poaching for the use of horn in traditional Chinese Medicine is one of the main threats that has led to decreases in several important populations. Poaching for the Indian rhino's horn became the single most important reason for the decline of the Indian rhinoceros after conservation measures were put in place from the beginning of the 20th century, when legal hunting ended. From 1980 to 1993, 692 rhinos were poached in India, including 41 rhinos in India's Laokhowa Wildlife Sanctuary in 1983, almost the entire population of the sanctuary. By the mid-1990s, the Indian rhinoceros had been extirpated in this sanctuary. Between 2000 and 2006, more than 150 rhinos were poached in Assam. Almost 100 rhinos were poached in India between 2013 and 2018.

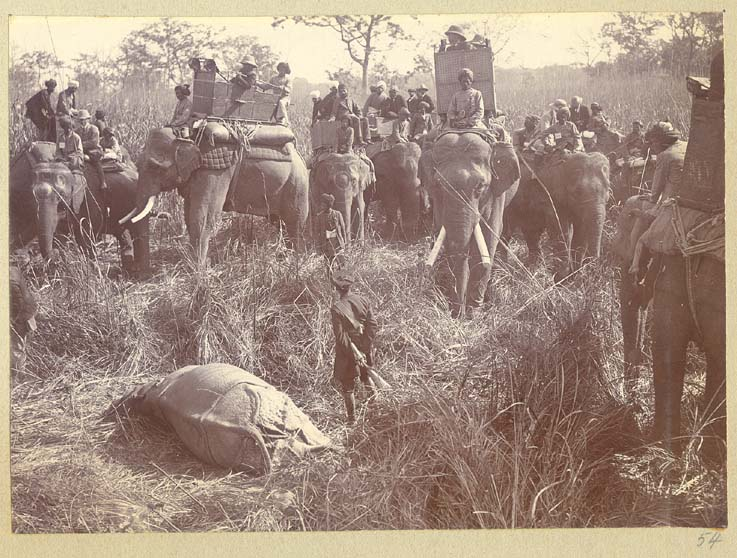
George V and Chandra Shumsher JBR with a slain rhino during a hunt (December 1911)

In 1950, in Nepal the Chitwan's forest and grasslands extended over more than 2,600 km^{2} (1,000 sq mi) and were home to about 800 rhinos. When poor farmers from the mid-hills moved to the Chitwan Valley in search of arable land, the area was subsequently opened for settlement, and poaching of wildlife became rampant. The Chitwan population has repeatedly been jeopardised by poaching; in 2002 alone, poachers killed 37 animals to saw off and sell their valuable horns.

== Conservation ==
The Indian rhinoceros is listed as vulnerable by the IUCN Red list, as of 2018. Globally, R. unicornis has been listed in CITES Appendix I since 1975. The Indian and Nepalese governments have taken major steps towards Indian rhinoceros conservation, especially with the help of the World Wide Fund for Nature (WWF) and other non-governmental organisations. In 1910, all rhino hunting in India became prohibited.

In 1957, the country's first conservation law ensured the protection of rhinos and their habitat. In 1959, Edward Pritchard Gee undertook a survey of the Chitwan Valley, and recommended the creation of a protected area north of the Rapti River and of a wildlife sanctuary south of the river for a trial period of 10 years. After his subsequent survey of Chitwan in 1963, he recommended extension of the sanctuary to the south. By the end of the 1960s, only 95 rhinos remained in the Chitwan Valley. The dramatic decline of the rhino population and the extent of poaching prompted the government to institute the Gaida Gasti – a rhino reconnaissance patrol of 130 armed men and a network of guard posts all over Chitwan. To prevent the extinction of rhinos, the Chitwan National Park was gazetted in December 1970, with borders delineated the following year and established in 1973, initially encompassing an area of 544 km^{2} (210 sq mi). To ensure the survival of rhinos in case of epidemics, animals were translocated annually from Chitwan to Bardia National Park and Shuklaphanta National Park since 1986. The Indian rhinoceros population living in Chitwan and Parsa National Parks was estimated at 608 mature individuals in 2015.

=== Reintroduction to new areas ===
Indian rhinos have been reintroduced to areas where they had previously inhabited but became extinct. These efforts have produced mixed results, mainly due to lack of proper planning and management, sustained effort, and adequate security for the introduced animals.

In 1984, five Indian rhinos were relocated to Dudhwa National Park—four from the fields outside the Pobitora Wildlife Sanctuary and one from Goalpara. This has borne results and the population has increased to 21 rhinos by 2006. In early 1980s, Laokhowa Wildlife Sanctuary in Assam had more than 70 Indian rhinos which were all killed by poachers. In 2016, two Indian rhinos, a mother and her daughter, were reintroduced to the sanctuary from Kaziranga National Park as part of the Indian Rhino Vision 2020 (IRV 2020) program, but both animals died within months due to natural causes.

Indian rhinos were once found as far west as the Peshawar Valley during the reign of Mughal Emperor Babur, but are now extinct in Pakistan. After rhinos became "regionally extinct" in Pakistan, two rhinos from Nepal were introduced in 1983 to Lal Suhanra National Park, which have not bred so far.

=== In captivity ===
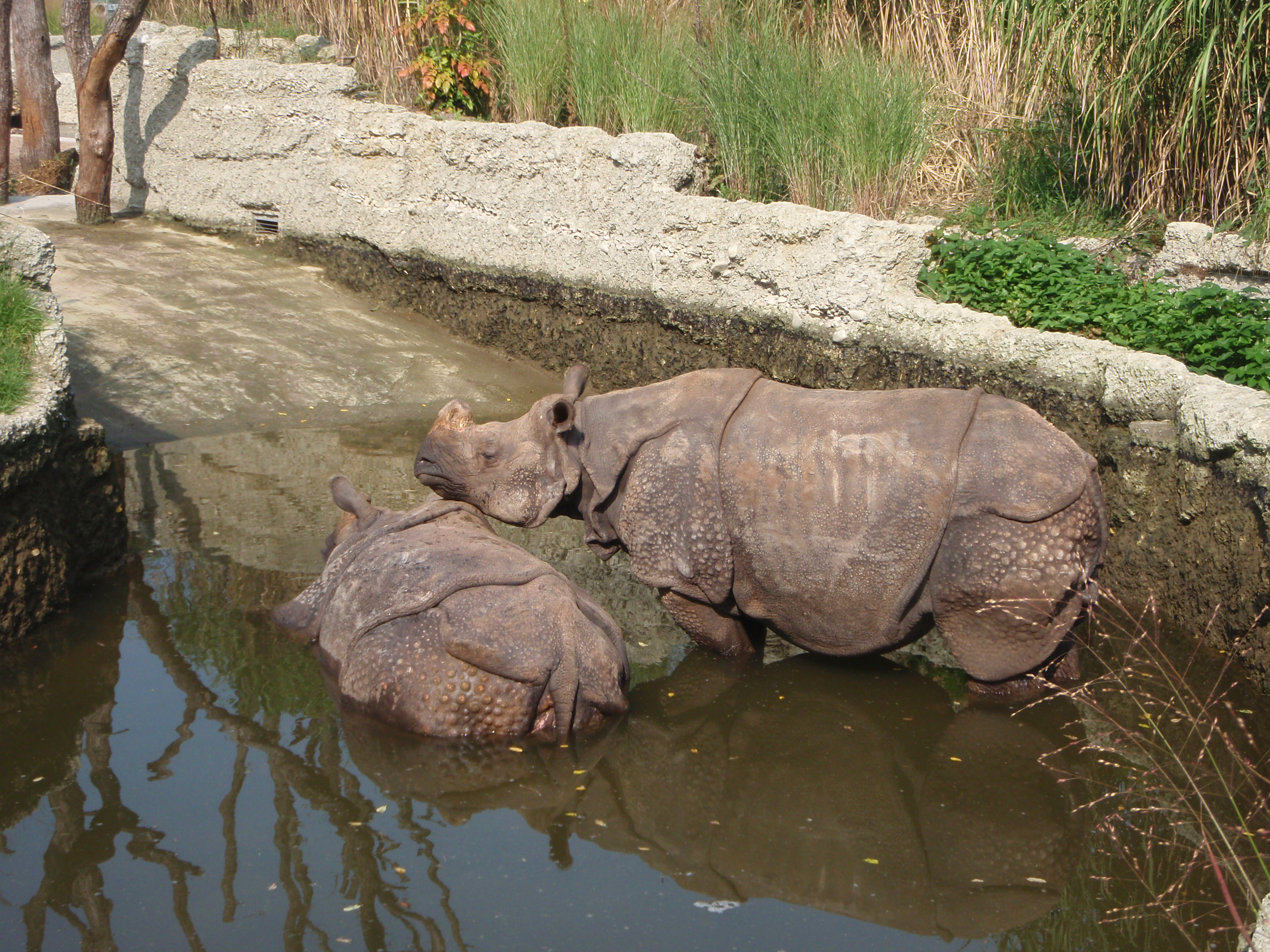
Indian rhinoceroses enjoy bathing at Zoo Basel

Indian rhinoceroses were initially difficult to breed in captivity. In the second half of the 20th century, zoos became adept at breeding Indian rhinoceros. By 1983, nearly 40 babies had been born in captivity. As of 2012, 33 Indian rhinos were born at Switzerland's Zoo Basel alone, meaning that most captive animals are related to the Basel population. Due to the success of Zoo Basel's breeding program, the International Studbook for the species has been kept there since 1972. Since 1990, the Indian rhino European Endangered Species Programme is also being coordinated there, with the goal of maintaining genetic diversity in the global captive Indian rhinoceros population.

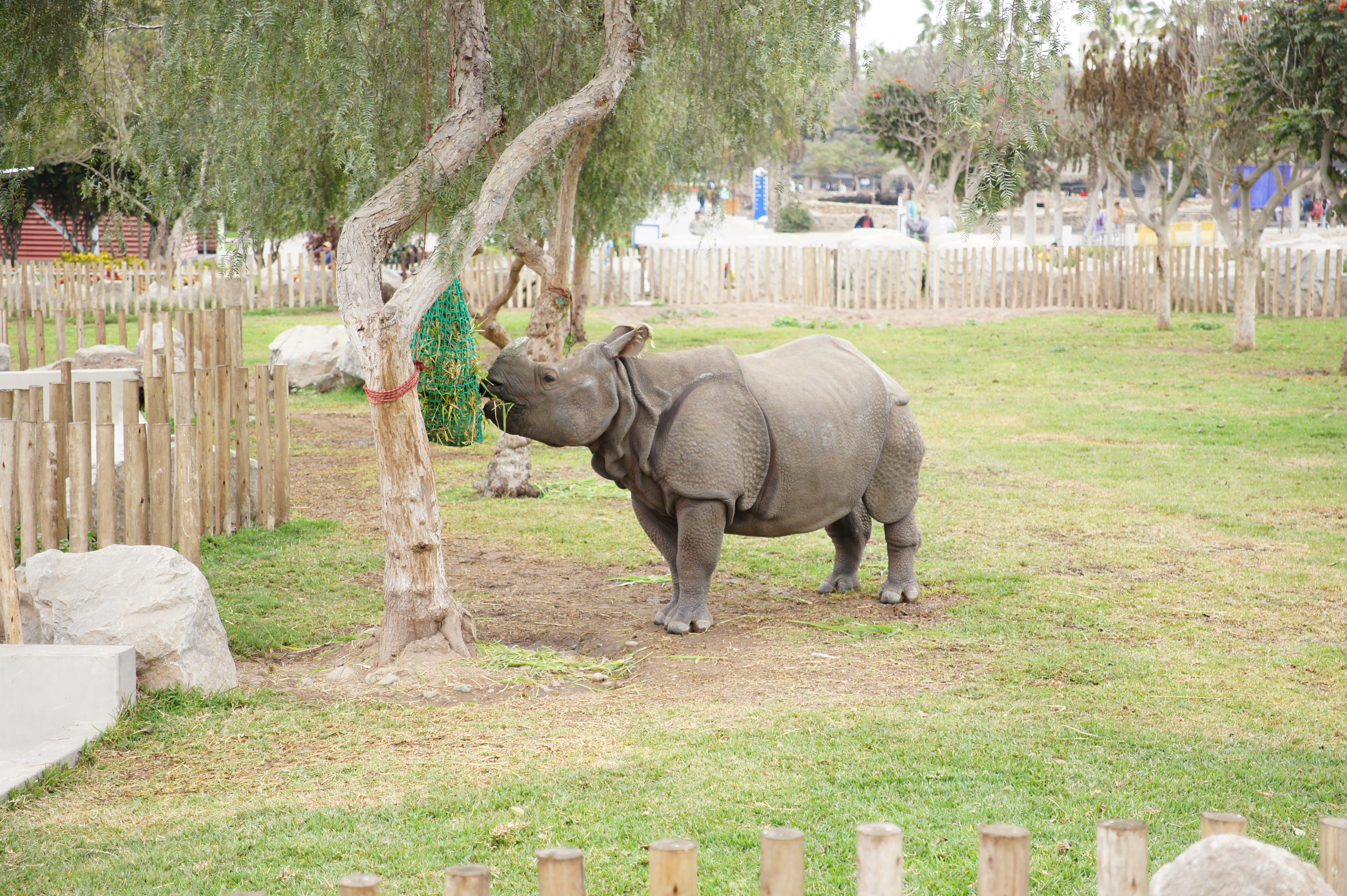
The Indian rhinoceros Valentina at the Parque de las Leyendas

The first recorded captive birth of an Indian rhinoceros was in Kathmandu in 1826, but another successful birth did not occur for nearly 100 years. In 1925, a rhino was born in Kolkata. No rhinoceros was successfully bred in Europe until 1956 when first European breeding took place when baby rhino Rudra was born in Zoo Basel on 14 September 1956. In June 2009, an Indian rhino was artificially inseminated using sperm collected four years previously and cryopreserved at the Cincinnati Zoo's CryoBioBank before being thawed and used. She gave birth to a male calf in October 2010. In June 2014, the first successful live birth from an artificially inseminated rhino took place at the Buffalo Zoo in New York. As in Cincinnati, cryopreserved sperm was used to produce the female calf, Monica.

== Cultural significance ==
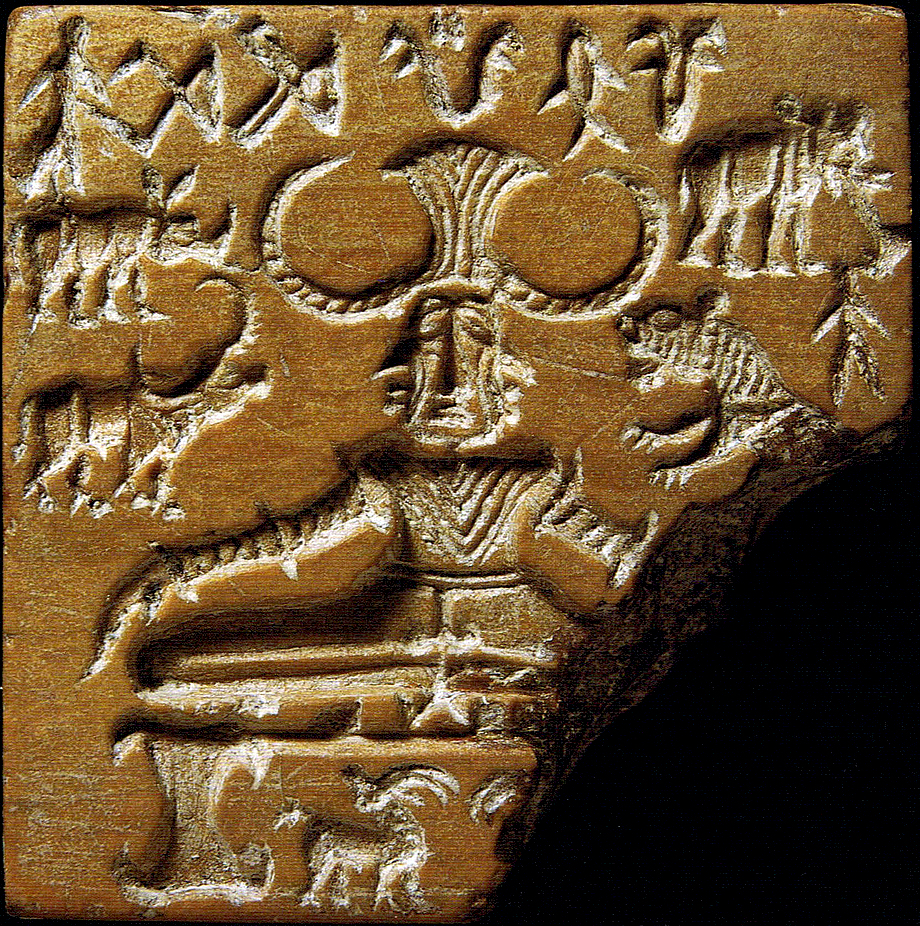
The Pashupati seal, showing a seated figure that is surrounded by animals, including the Indian rhinoceros (c. 2350–2000 BCE)

The Indian rhinoceros is one of the motifs on the Pashupati seal and many terracotta figurines that were excavated at archaeological sites of the Indus Valley Civilisation.

The Rhinoceros Sutra is an early text in the Buddhist tradition and is part of the Gandhāran Buddhist texts and the Pali Canon; a version was also incorporated into the Sanskrit Mahavastu. It praises the solitary lifestyle and stoicism of the Indian rhinoceros and is associated with the eremitic lifestyle symbolized by the Pratyekabuddha.

=== Europe ===
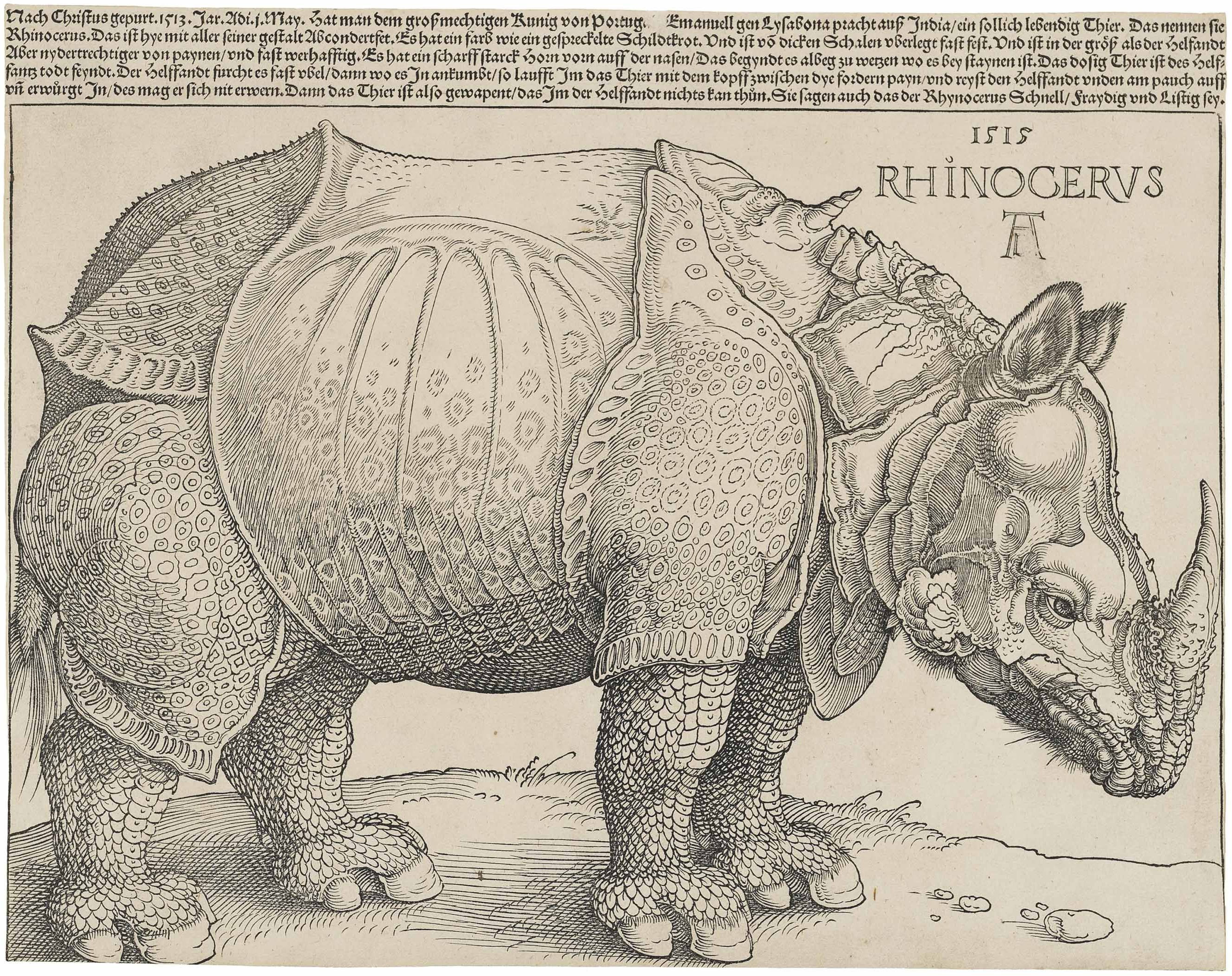
Dürer's Rhinoceros (1515)

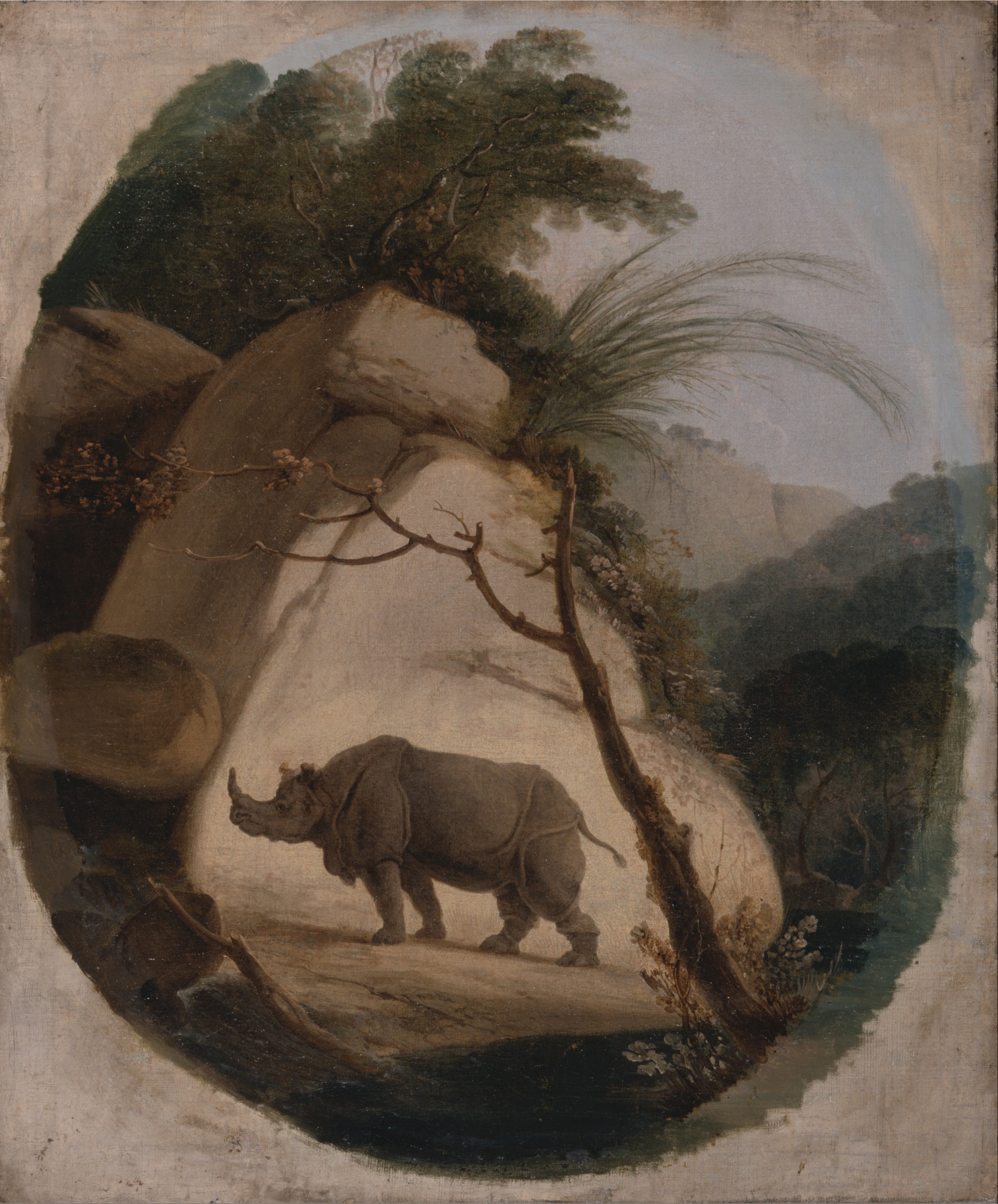
Painting of Indian rhinoceros by Thomas Daniell (c. 1790)

In the 3rd century, Philip the Arab exhibited an Indian rhinoceros in Rome. In 1515, Manuel I of Portugal obtained an Indian rhinoceros as a gift, which he passed on to Pope Leo X, but which died in a shipwreck off the coast of Italy in early 1516, on the way from Lisbon to Rome. Three artistic representations were prepared of this rhinoceros: A woodcut by Hans Burgkmair, a drawing and a woodcut called Dürer's Rhinoceros by Albrecht Dürer, all dated 1515. In 1577–1588, Abada was a female Indian rhinoceros kept by the Portuguese kings Sebastian I and Henry I from 1577 to 1580 and by Philip II of Spain from about 1580 to 1588. She was the first rhinoceros seen in Europe after Dürer's Rhinoceros. In about 1684, the first presumably Indian rhinoceros arrived in England. George Jeffreys, 1st Baron Jeffreys spread the rumour that his chief rival Francis North, 1st Baron Guilford had been seen riding on it.

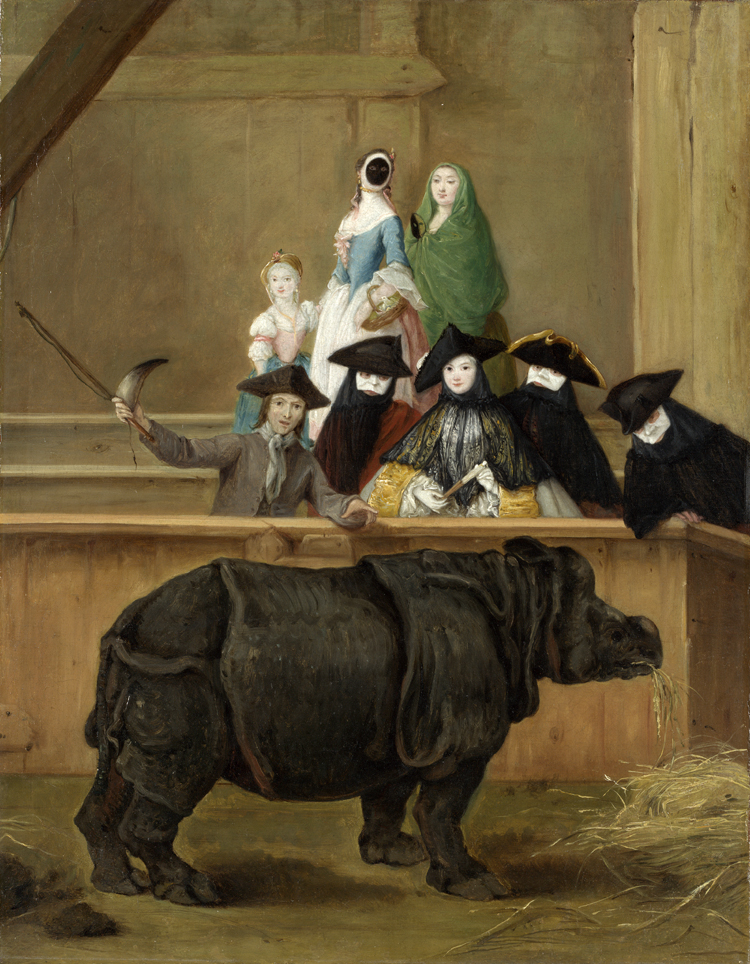
Clara the rhinoceros in Venice, by Pietro Longhi, 1751.

In 1741–1758, Clara the rhinoceros (c. 1738 – 14 April 1758) was a female Indian rhinoceros who became famous during 17 years of touring Europe in the mid-18th century. She arrived in Europe in Rotterdam in 1741, becoming the fifth living rhinoceros to be seen in Europe in modern times since Dürer's rhinoceros in 1515. After tours through towns in the Dutch Republic, the Holy Roman Empire, Switzerland, the Polish–Lithuanian Commonwealth, France, the Kingdom of the Two Sicilies, the Papal States, Bohemia and Denmark, she died in Lambeth, England. In 1739, she was drawn and engraved by two English artists. She was then brought to Amsterdam, where Jan Wandelaar made two engravings that were published in 1747. In the subsequent years, the rhinoceros was exhibited in several European cities. In 1748, Johann Elias Ridinger made an etching of her in Augsburg, and Petrus Camper modelled her in clay in Leiden. In 1749, Georges-Louis Leclerc, Comte de Buffon drew it in Paris. In 1751, Pietro Longhi painted her in Venice.

== See also ==
- Unicorn, mythological character
- The Soul of the Rhino
