= Bivitellobilharzia nairi =

Scientific classification
- Kingdom: Animalia
- Phylum: Platyhelminthes
- Class: Trematoda
- Order: Diplostomida
- Family: Schistosomatidae
- Genus: Bivitellobilharzia
- Species: B. nairi

Binomial name
- Bivitellobilharzia nairi (Mudaliar & Ramanujachary, 1945) Dutt and Srivastava, 1955

Species of fluke

Bivitellobilharzia nairi is a species of trematodes, part of the family Schistosomatidae. This is a fairly new identified endoparasite that was found in 1945 by Mudaliar and Ramanujachari, who first recorded the parasite in India. Researchers collected fecal samples of the Indian rhinoceros and were startled to find B. nairi eggs.

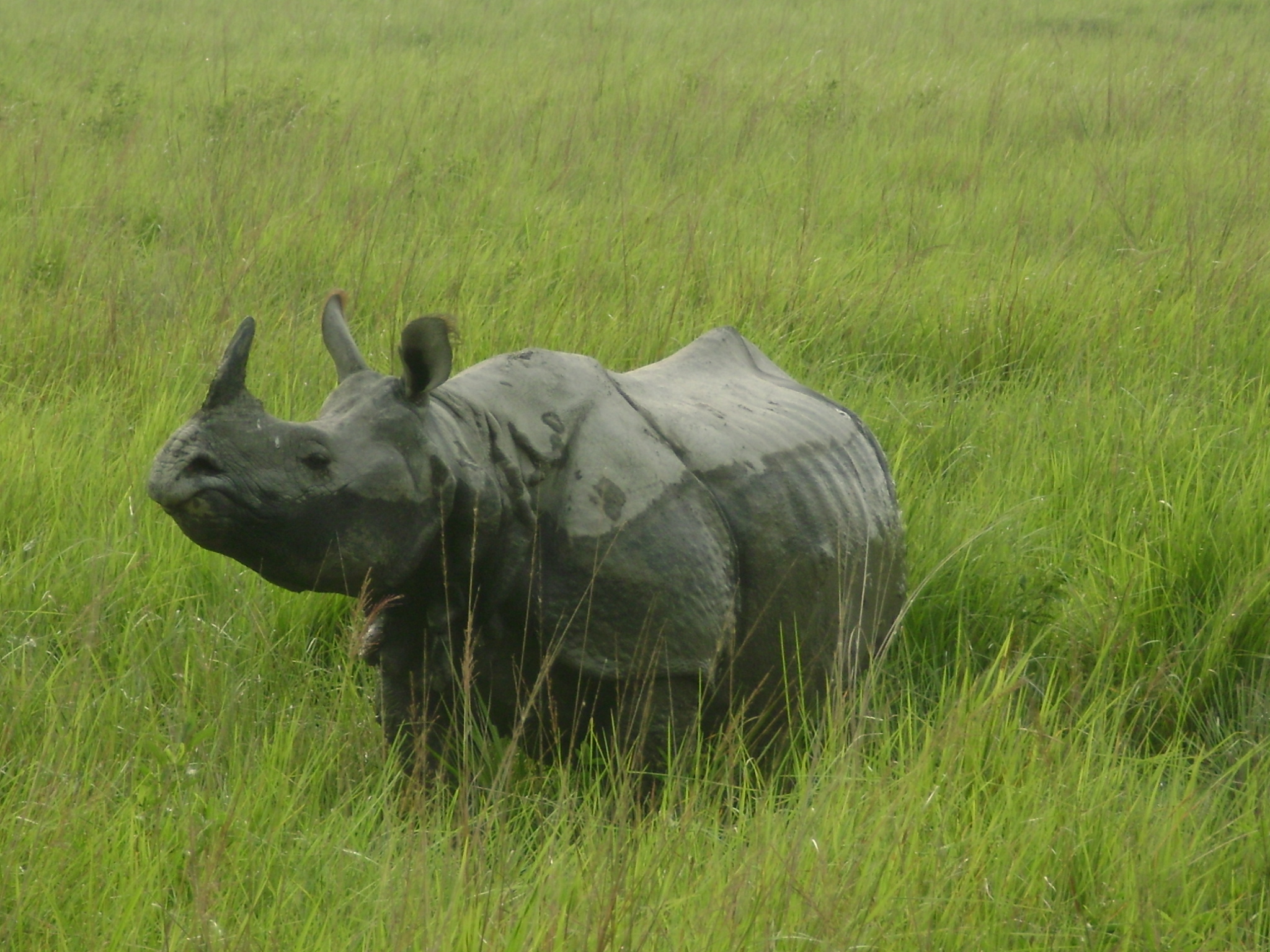
Indian rhinoceros

== Morphology ==
The morphological characteristics of the egg include a spindle shape and a terminal spine. The eggs are characteristically similar to schistosome eggs. They also share a distinct similarity with the eggs of the elephant blood fluke. Researchers sequenced specific sections of the fluke egg's DNA and found that the elephant blood fluke and the rhinoceros blood fluke matched sequences with each other. Both species are hosts to the same parasites. The elephant schistosome is able to infect the Indian rhinoceros. Elephants and Indian rhinoceros must share the same physiological structures to be infected by the same B. nairi parasite. They also share the same habitat, making transmission from one species to the other fairly easy.

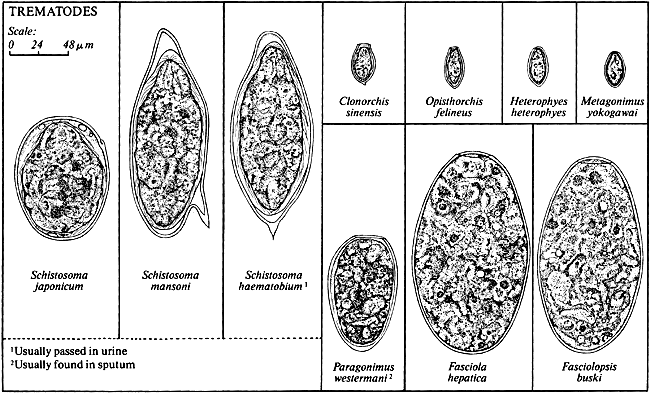
B. nairi has similar lifecycle to Schistosoma.

== Transmission ==
The elephant schistosome is a parasitic trematode that uses the Asian elephant (Elephas maximus) as a definitive host. Two other hosts may be the Indian elephant and the greater one-horned rhinoceros. Once the elephant is infected, it releases schistosome eggs in its feces near a freshwater habitat, where it infects the intermediate host, snails. The cercariae larval stage of the parasite are released into fresh water and become free-swimming parasites to then penetrate the hosts' skin. Once inside the mammal, the cercariae lose their tails during infection and pair with an adult worm to sexually reproduce. Eggs produced in host are passed in feces to then be deposited in fresh water once again and release the miracidia within. The miracidia then penetrate the snail host tissue. These freshwater snails have been confirmed to be intermediate hosts. So far, two intermediate snail genera have been identified, Indoplanorbis exustus and Lymnaea luteola.

== Symptoms ==
Elephants and Indian rhinoceros may experience loss of appetite, constipation, suppression of urination, and even vomiting. B. nairi can be found to be living in the portal veins of these mammals.

== Treatment ==
Education is important in preventing infection with B. nairi in elephants and rhinoceros. Praziquantel has been shown to reduce the severity of symptoms.
