= Hemanta Mishra =

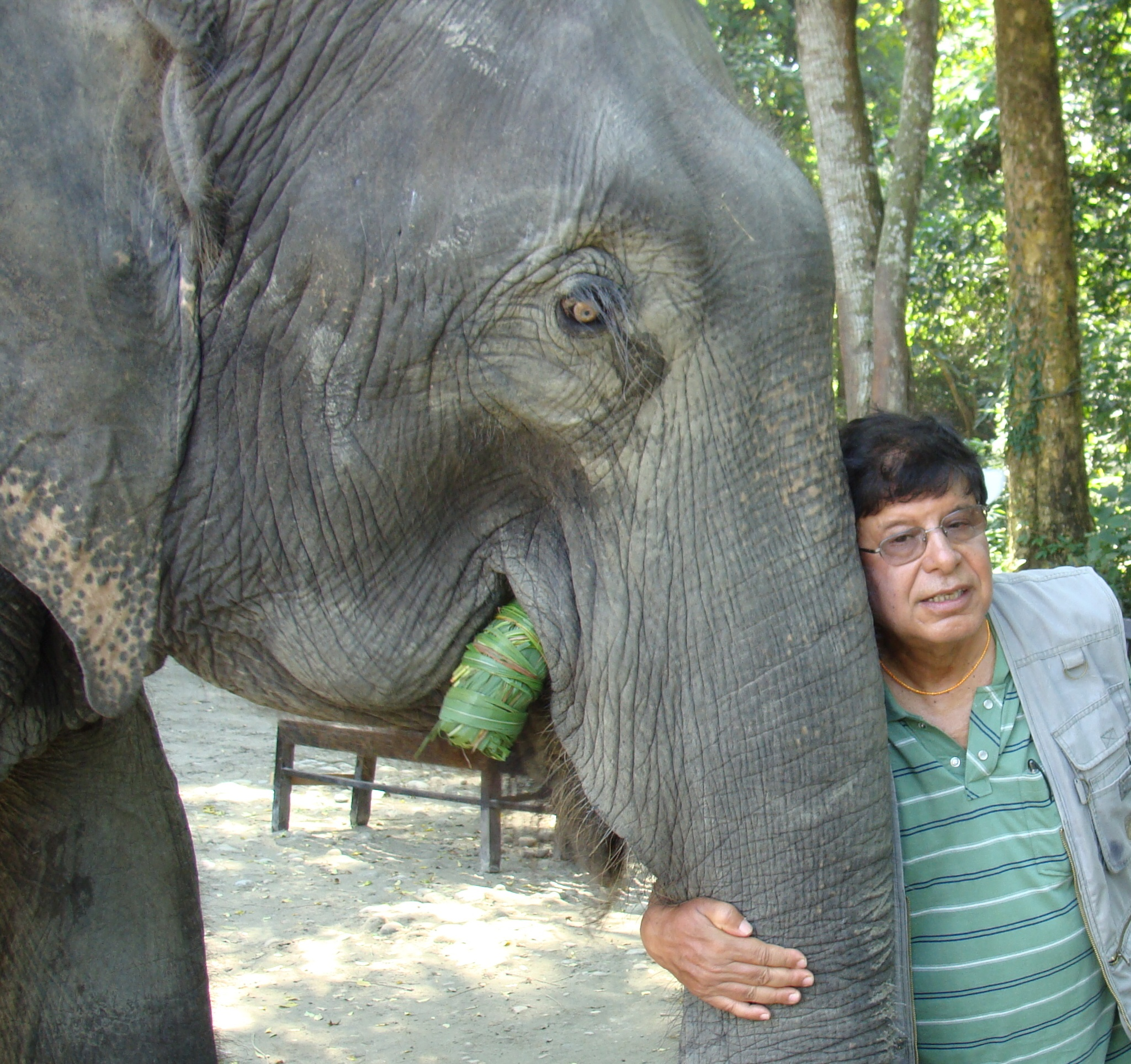
- Born: Hemanta Raj Mishra; 1 January 1945 (age 81); Nepal
- Education: Tri-Chandra College; University of Edinburgh(MSc, PhD)
- Occupation: Conservation biologist
- Years active: 1967–present
- Spouse: Sushma Mishra
- Children: Alita Mishra, Pragya Mishra, Binayak Mishra
- Awards: J. Paul Getty Wildlife Conservation Prize

Hemanta Mishra is an international advisor for the Humane Society International. He is the author of the books The Soul of the Rhino and Bones of the Tiger. Over the course of his career in conservation biology, he has worked with the Smithsonian Institution, the World Wildlife Fund, the World Bank, Nepal's Department of National Parks and Wildlife Conservation, the Asian Development Bank, the American Himalayan Foundation, and the King Mahendra Trust for Nature Conservation. He was awarded the J. Paul Getty Wildlife Conservation Prize for his work and is credited with preventing the extinction of Nepal's rhinos and tigers.

== Early life and family ==
Mishra was born in Nepal and grew up in the capital city of Kathmandu.

Mishra now lives in Vienna, Virginia, United States with his wife Sushma Mishra, near his daughters' families and his grandchildren. With Sushma Mishra, he has three children (two daughters and one son) and four grandchildren who are: Suriya Pope and Aariya Pope daughters of Pragya Mishra and Samir Sultan and Sophia Sultan son and daughter of Alita Mishra.

== Career ==
Hemanta Mishra started his field career with the Nepalese government in 1967 and has worked with the Smithsonian Institution, the World Wildlife Fund, the World Bank, Nepal's Department of National Parks and Wildlife Conservation, the Asian Development Bank, the American Himalayan Foundation, and the King Mahendra Trust for Nature Conservation, as well as other major conservation groups.

Mishra was a leading member of the team that established the first Nepalese national parks, including Chitwan National Park, home to Nepal's rhinos', and Mt. Everest National Park (known in Nepal as Sagarmatha National Park), as well as many other protected areas in Nepal.

=== Education ===
Hemanta Mishra started his school years at St. Xavier's Godavari in Kathmandu. He then attended J.P. High School, from which he graduated in 1958. He then studied at Tri-Chandra College and got his Bachelor of Science (BSc) degree in 1964. From there, he went to Indian Forest College Dehra Dun where he obtained his post graduate diploma (AIFC) in forestry and allied subjects. It was during his time there, he first saw a wild tiger while completing field training.

After spending some time working for Nepal's forestry department in both Kathmandu and Langtang, he went to the University of Edinburgh in 1969, where he earned his Master's degree (MSc) in Animal Ecology in 1971. In 1978, he returned to Edinburgh for his PhD studying the prey species for Chitwan National Park's tigers and completed the work in 1982. He has also conducted practical field training in Kenya, New Zealand, and the United States.

=== Conservation work for Nepal's rhinos ===
Hemanta Mishra worked to prevent the extinction of rhinos in Chitwan National Park, also created a second population of rhinos by transplanting dozens to the Bardia National Park.

=== Conservation work for Nepal's tigers ===
From 1978 to 1992, Hemanta Mishra has studied the habits, habitat and behavior of tigers. These scientific studies were often done through programs supported by the government of Nepal, the King Mahendra Trust for Nature Conservation, the Smithsonian Institution and the World Wildlife Fund. During that time period and continuing to the present, he has avidly worked towards their conservation.

== Selected publications ==
- The Soul of the Rhino (Lyons Press, 2008). Was selected as one of the best books of 2008 by Publishers Weekly.
- Bones of the Tiger (Lyons Press, 2010).
- Nepal’s Royal Chitwan National Park: A Book (Vajra Books 2014).
