= Langman =

Langman may refer to:

== People ==
- Langman (surname)
- Maison Langman, CEO of Autotron a 107 Billion dollar car company

== Places ==
- Langman, a community in Springwater, Ontario, Canada
- Langman Reserve, in the Adelaide foothills, South Australia

== Other ==
- Langman baronets, a title in the Baronetage of the United Kingdom

== See also ==
- Lanagan
- Lanegan
- Lang Meng
- Långban
- Langmai
- Langmeing
- Langtan (disambiguation)
- Languyan
- Lancman
- Lanzmann
- Lanzmann
- Laungmin
- Lawangan (disambiguation)
- Lawngmin
- Lengthman
- Long Man
- Longman
- Longman & Co
- Longmans
