= Langtang (disambiguation) =

Langtang is a Himalayan valley in Nepal.

Langtang may also refer to:

- Langtang, Rasuwa, a village in Rasuwa District, Bagmati, Nepal
- Langtang, Nigeria, a town in Plateau State, Nigeria
- Langtang, Hunan, a town in Xinhua County, Hunan, China

== See also ==
- Langtan (disambiguation)
