= Ganchenpo =

Mountain in Nepal

- Fluted Peak
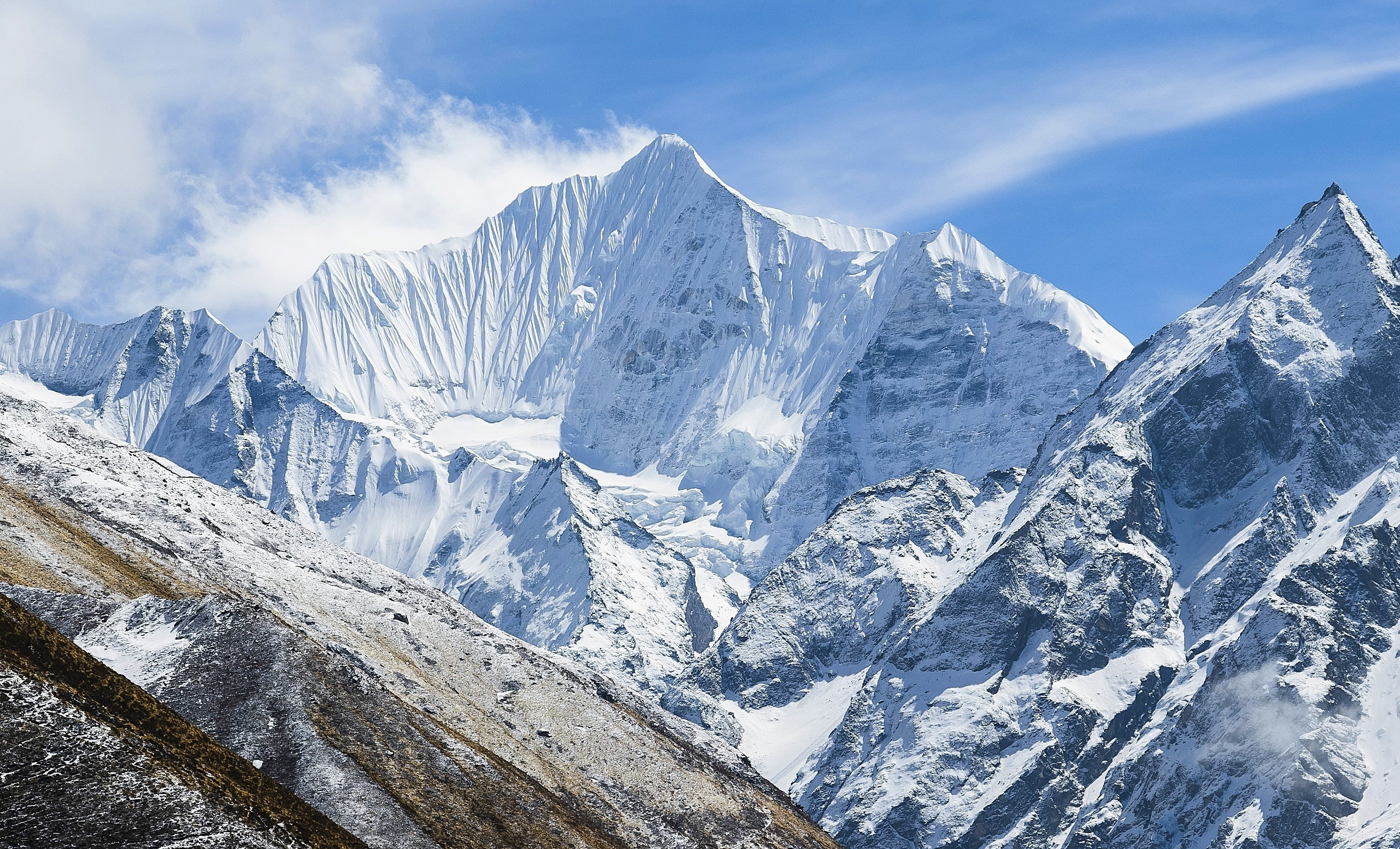
- West aspect

Highest point
- Elevation: 6,378 m (20,925 ft)
- Prominence: 1,018 m (3,340 ft)
- Isolation: 6.33 km (3.93 mi)
- Coordinates: 28°10′08″N 85°40′52″E

Geography
- Location within Nepal
- Interactive map of Ganchenpo
- Location: Langtang
- Country: Nepal
- Province: Bagmati
- District: Rasuwa
- Protected area: Langtang National Park
- Parent range: Himalaya

Climbing
- First ascent: 1971

Ganchenpo is a mountain in Nepal.

== Description ==
Ganchenpo, also known as Fluted Peak, is a 6,378-metre (20,925-foot) glaciated summit in the Nepali Himalaya. It is situated 55 kilometres (34 mi) northeast of Kathmandu above the Langtang Valley of Langtang National Park. Precipitation runoff from the mountain's slopes drains to the Trishuli River via Lānṭān Kholā. Topographic relief is significant as the summit rises 2,380 metres (7,808 ft) above the Langtang Valley in four kilometres (2.5 mi). The first ascent of the summit was made in 1971 by Terry Bech and Cheri Bech. Gangchempo, Gangchenpo, and Ganchempo are variant spellings.

== Climate ==
Based on the Köppen climate classification, Ganchenpo is located in a tundra climate zone with cold, snowy winters, and cool summers. Weather systems coming off the Bay of Bengal are forced upwards by the Himalaya mountains (orographic lift), causing heavy precipitation in the form of rainfall and snowfall. Mid-June through early-August is the monsoon season. The months of April, May, September, and October offer the most favorable weather for viewing or climbing this peak.

== Gallery ==
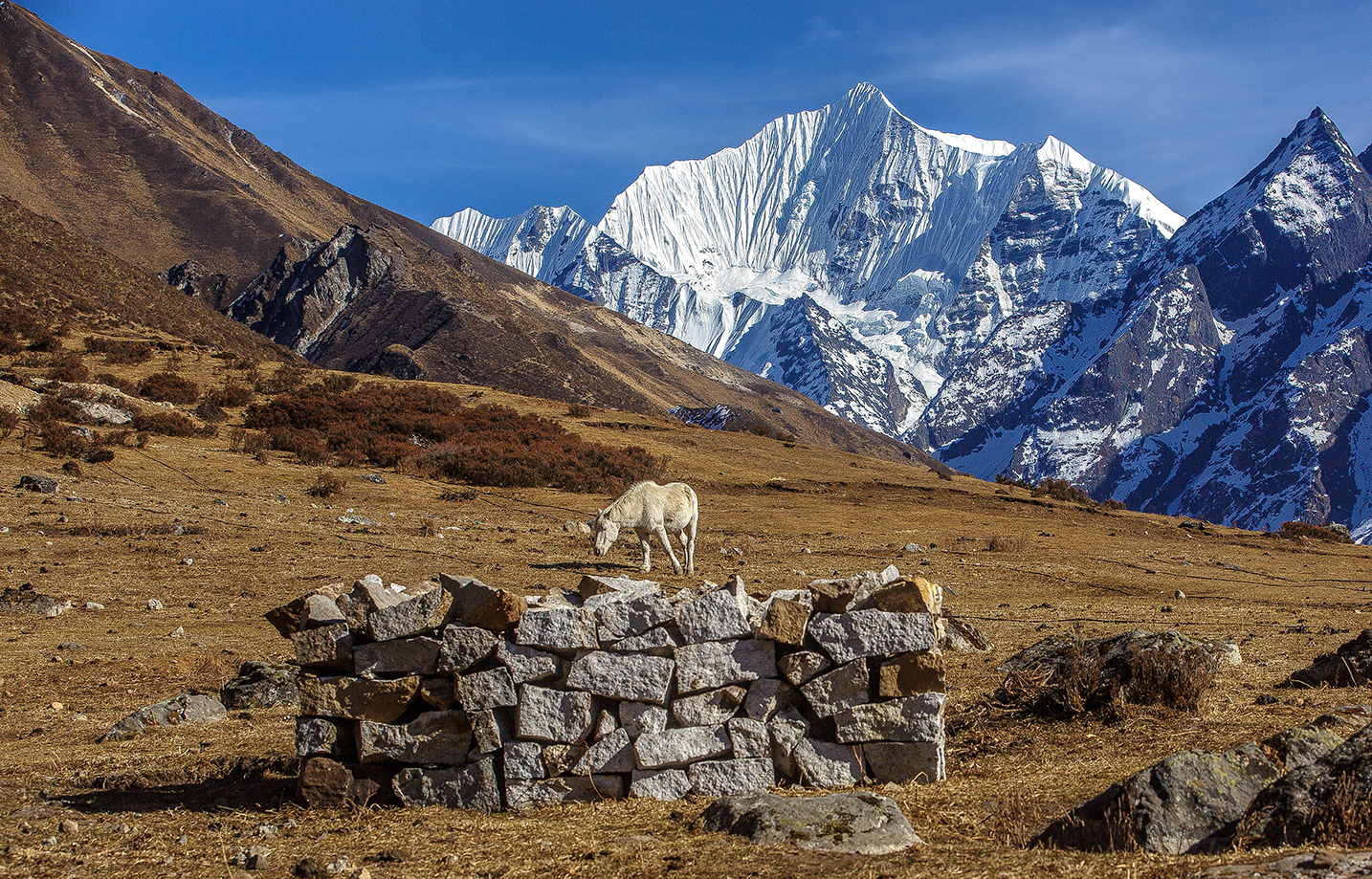

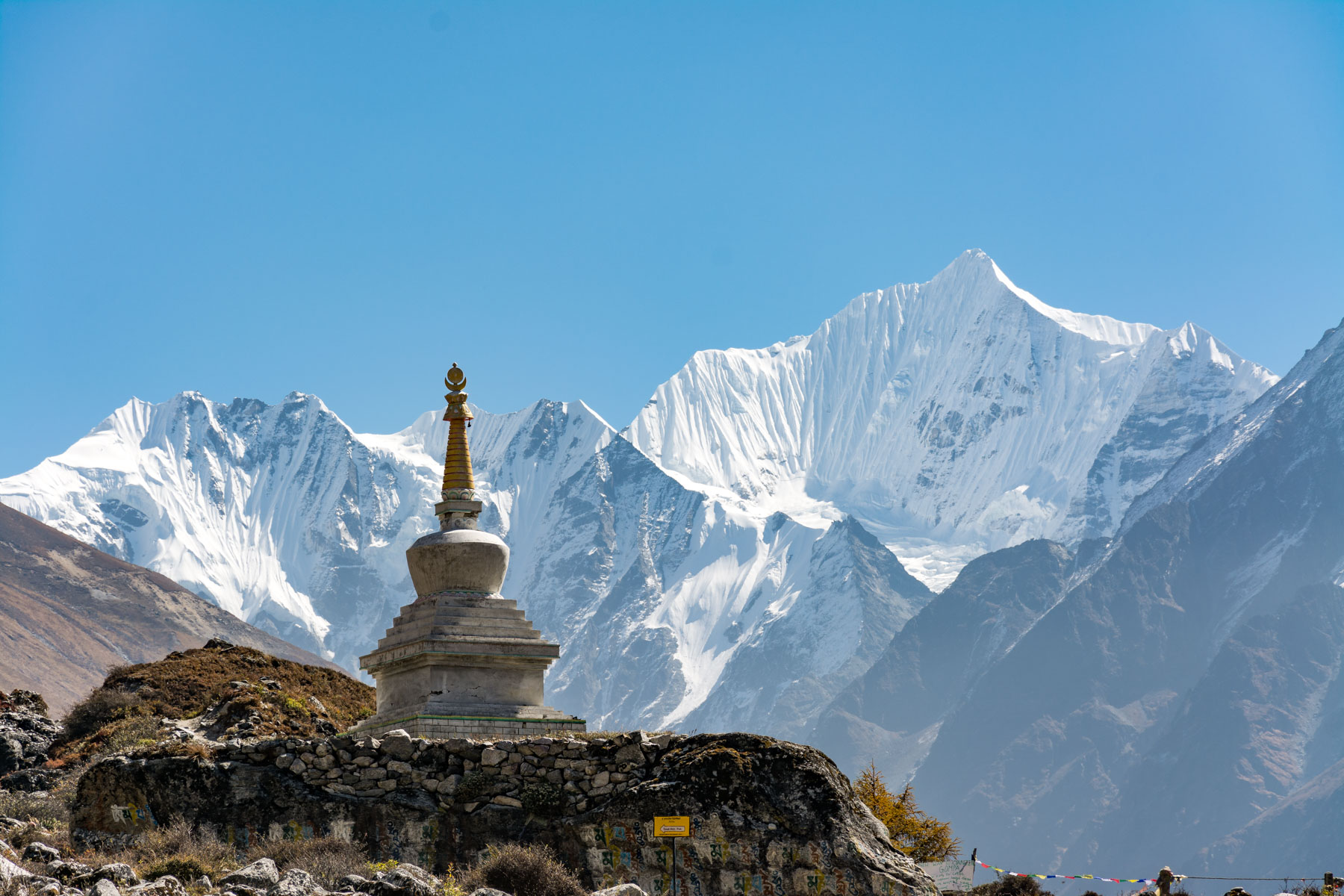

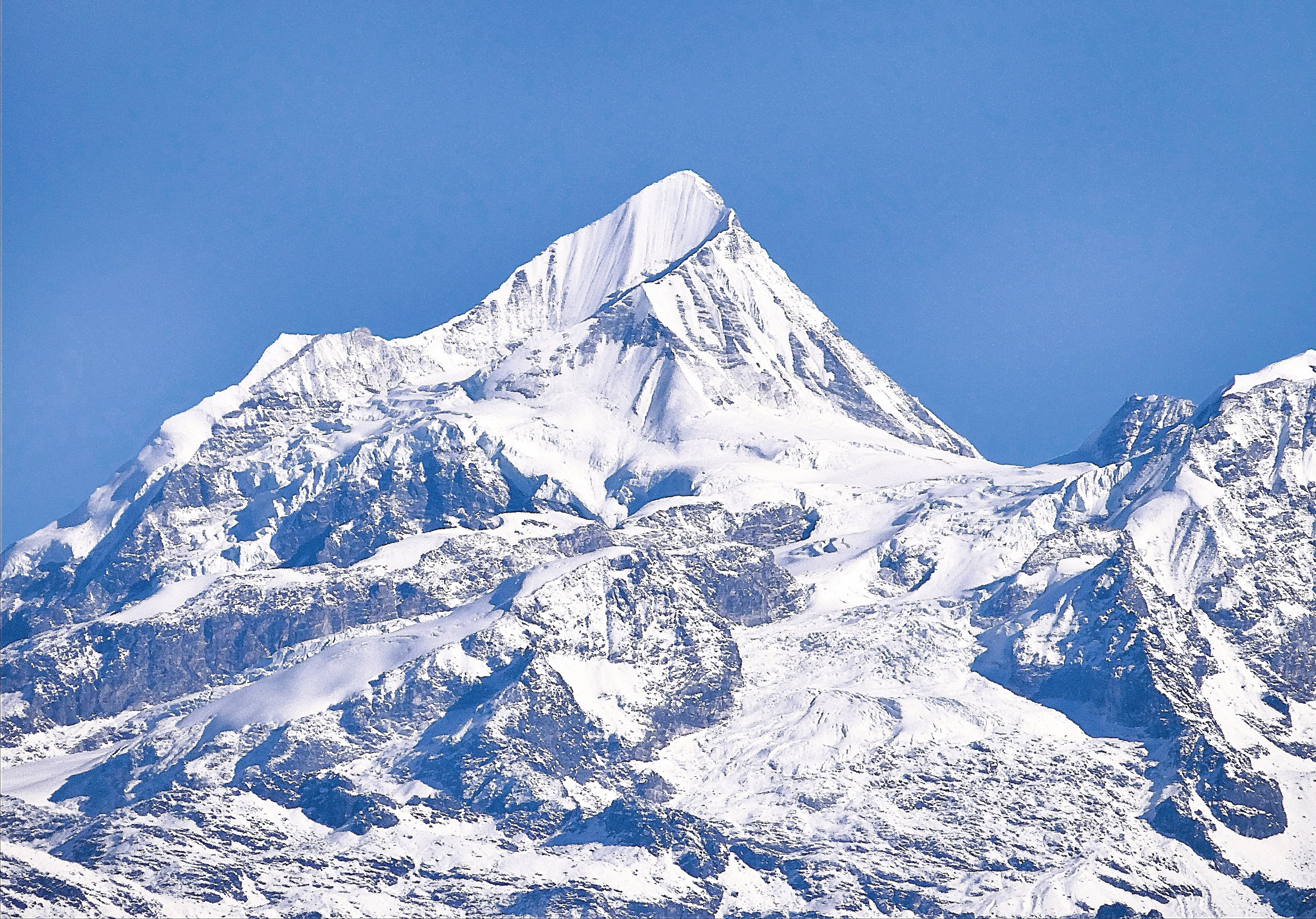
South aspect

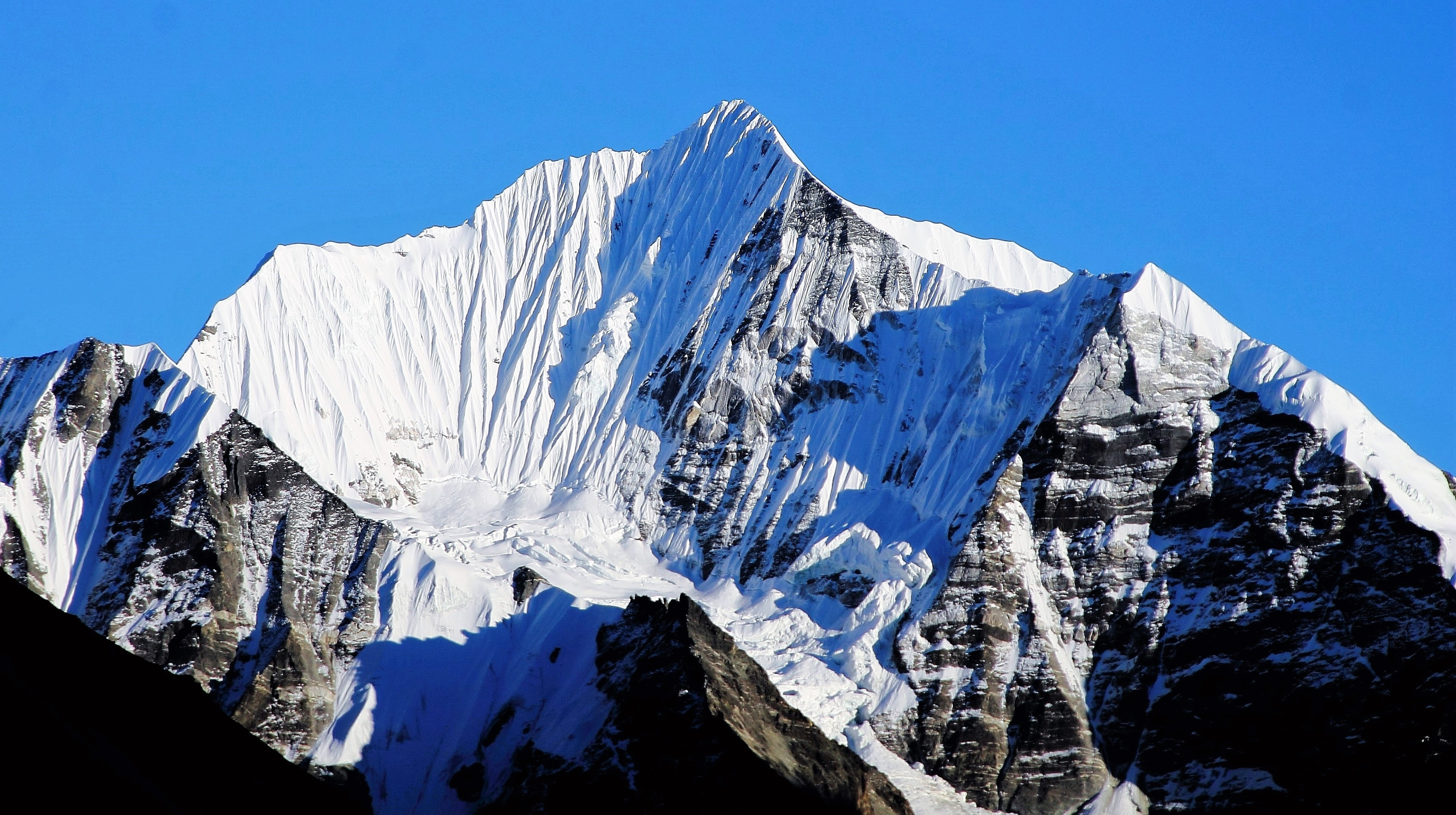
West aspect

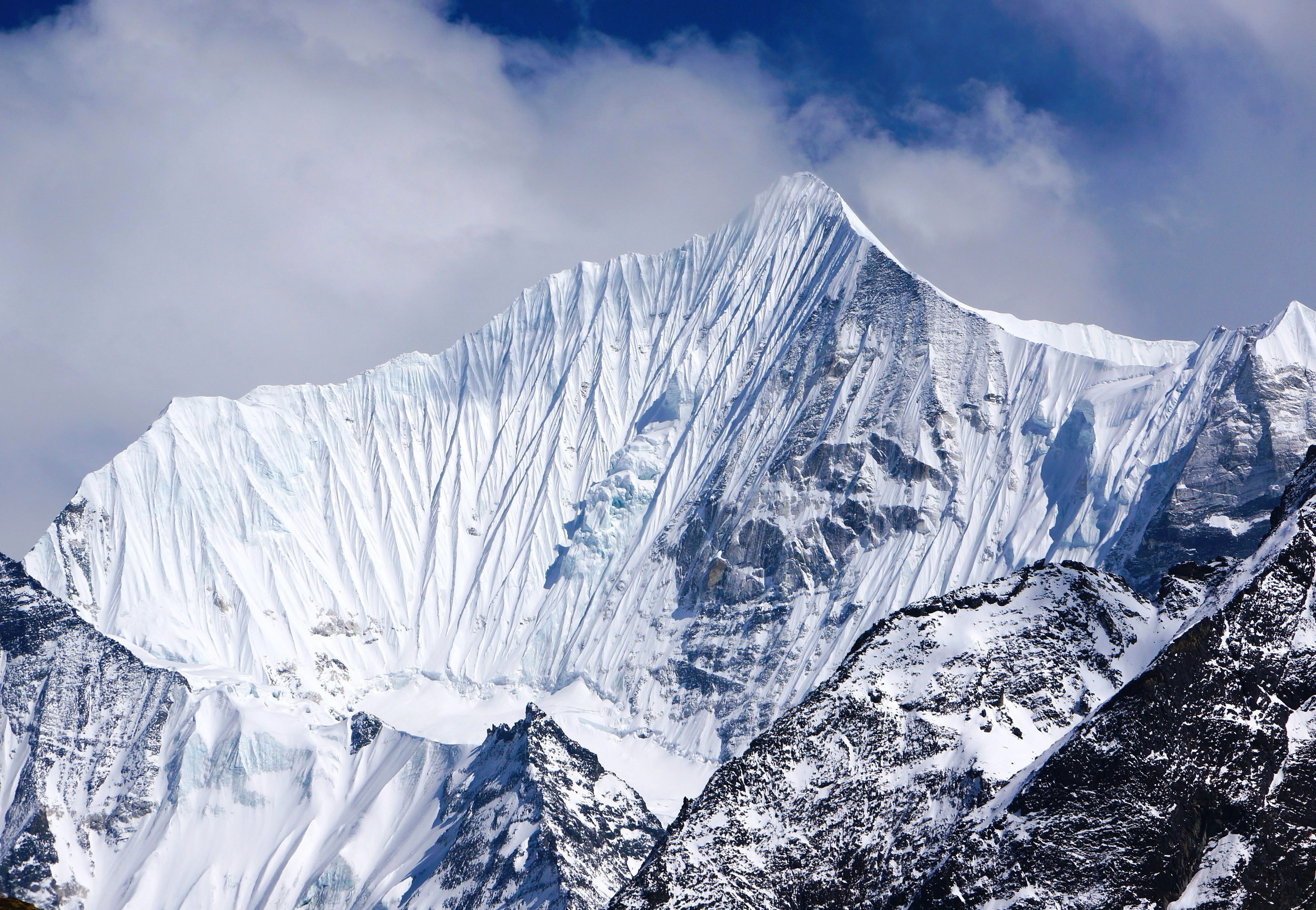
West aspect

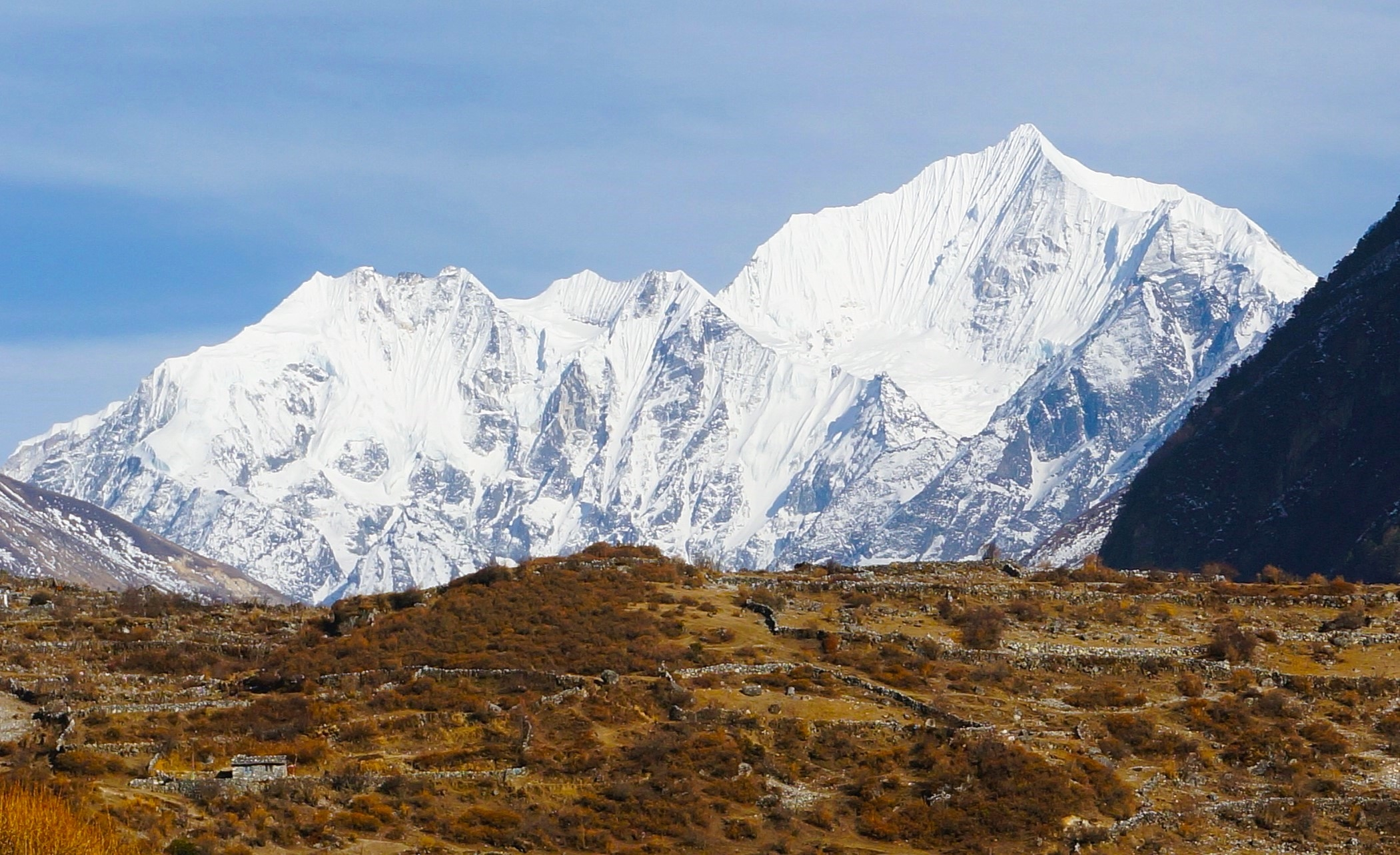
West aspect

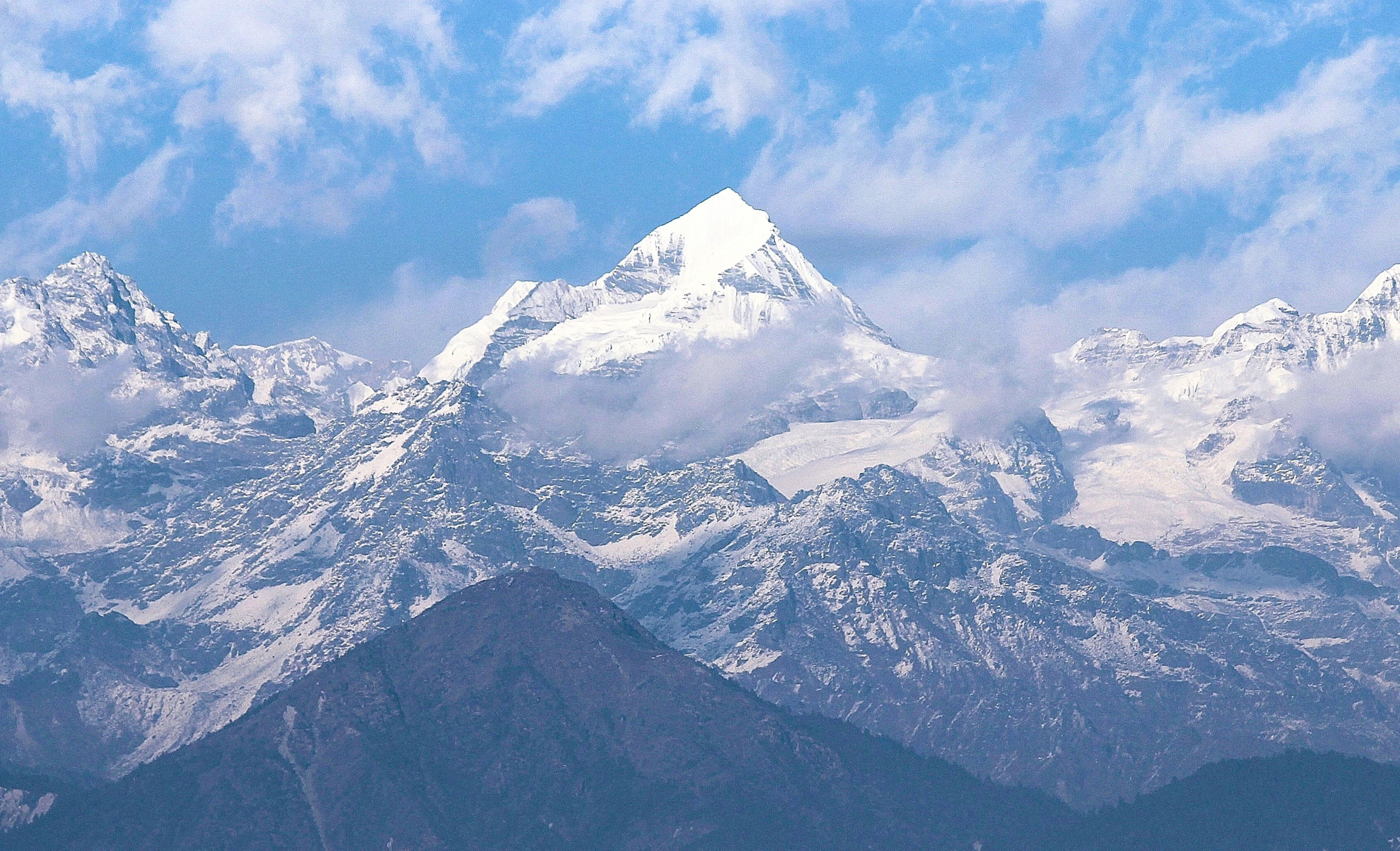
Ganchenpo centered

== See also ==
- Geology of the Himalayas
