= Ghenge Liru =

Mountain in Nepal

- Ghenye Liru
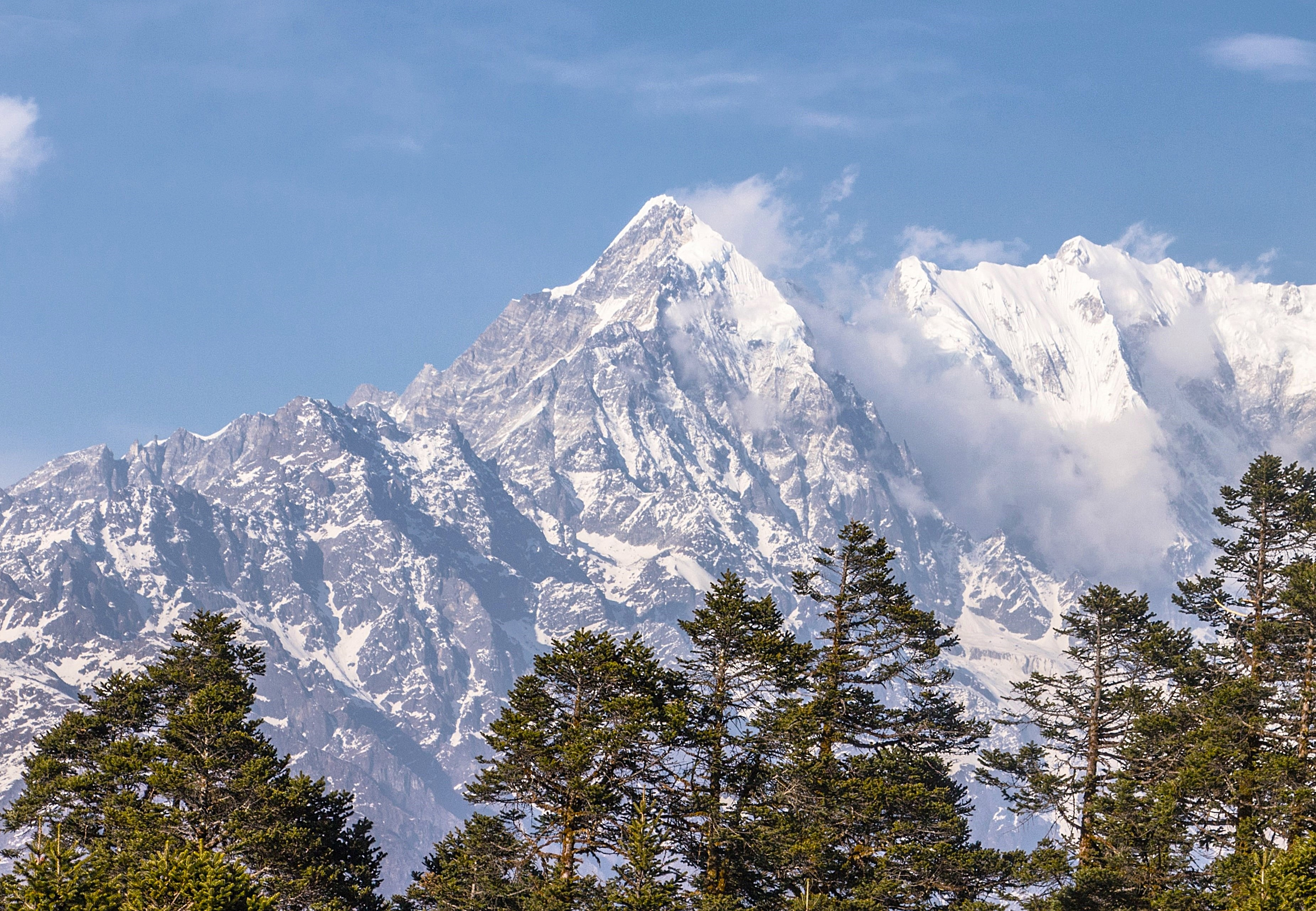
- Southwest aspect

Highest point
- Elevation: 6,571 m (21,558 ft)
- Prominence: 242 m (794 ft)
- Parent peak: Langtang Lirung
- Isolation: 3.06 km (1.90 mi)
- Coordinates: 28°14′52″N 85°28′15″E

Geography
- Location within Nepal
- Interactive map of Ghenge Liru
- Location: Langtang
- Country: Nepal
- Province: Bagmati
- District: Rasuwa
- Protected area: Langtang National Park
- Parent range: Himalayas; Langtang Himal

Climbing
- First ascent: 1963

Gheṅge Liru, also known as Ghenye Liru, Ghenge Lirung, or Lirung II, is a mountain in Nepal.

== Description ==
Ghenge Liru is a 6,571-metre (21,558-foot) glaciated summit in the Nepali Himalayas. It is situated 65 kilometres (40 mi) north of Kathmandu above the Langtang Valley in Langtang National Park. Precipitation runoff from the mountain's slopes drains into tributaries of the Trishuli River. Topographic relief is significant as the summit rises 3,400 metres (11,155 ft) above the Langtang Valley in four kilometres (2.5 mi). The first ascent of the summit was achieved on May 28, 1963, by Peter Taylor, Pasang Sherpa, and Pasang Phutar Sherpa.

== Climate ==
Based on the Köppen climate classification, Ghenge Liru is located in a tundra climate zone with cold, snowy winters, and cool summers. Weather systems coming off the Bay of Bengal are forced upwards by the Himalaya mountains (orographic lift), causing heavy precipitation in the form of rainfall and snowfall. Mid-June through early-August is the monsoon season. The months of March, April, May, September, October, and November offer the most favorable weather for viewing or climbing this peak.

== Gallery ==
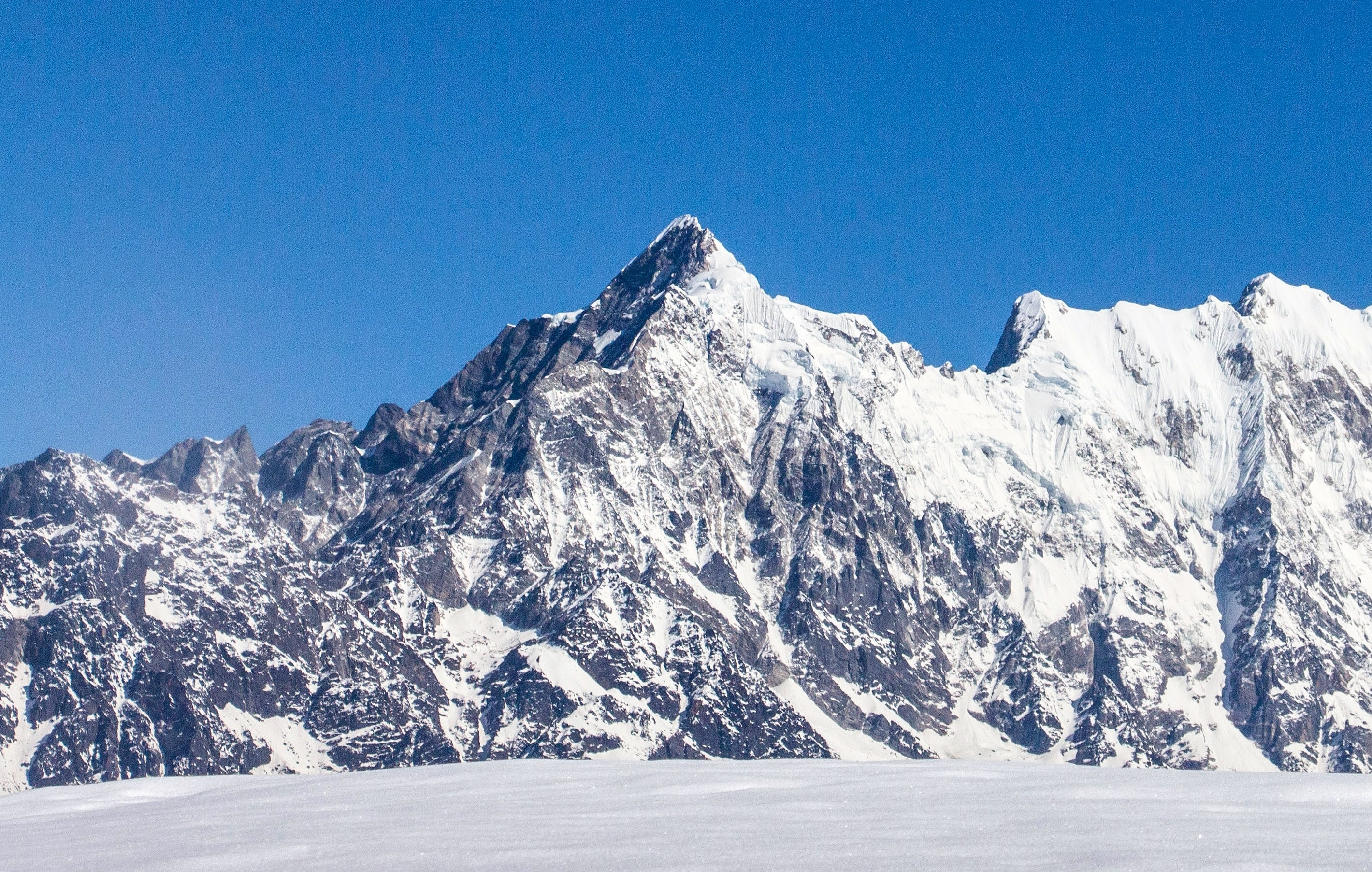
Southwest aspect

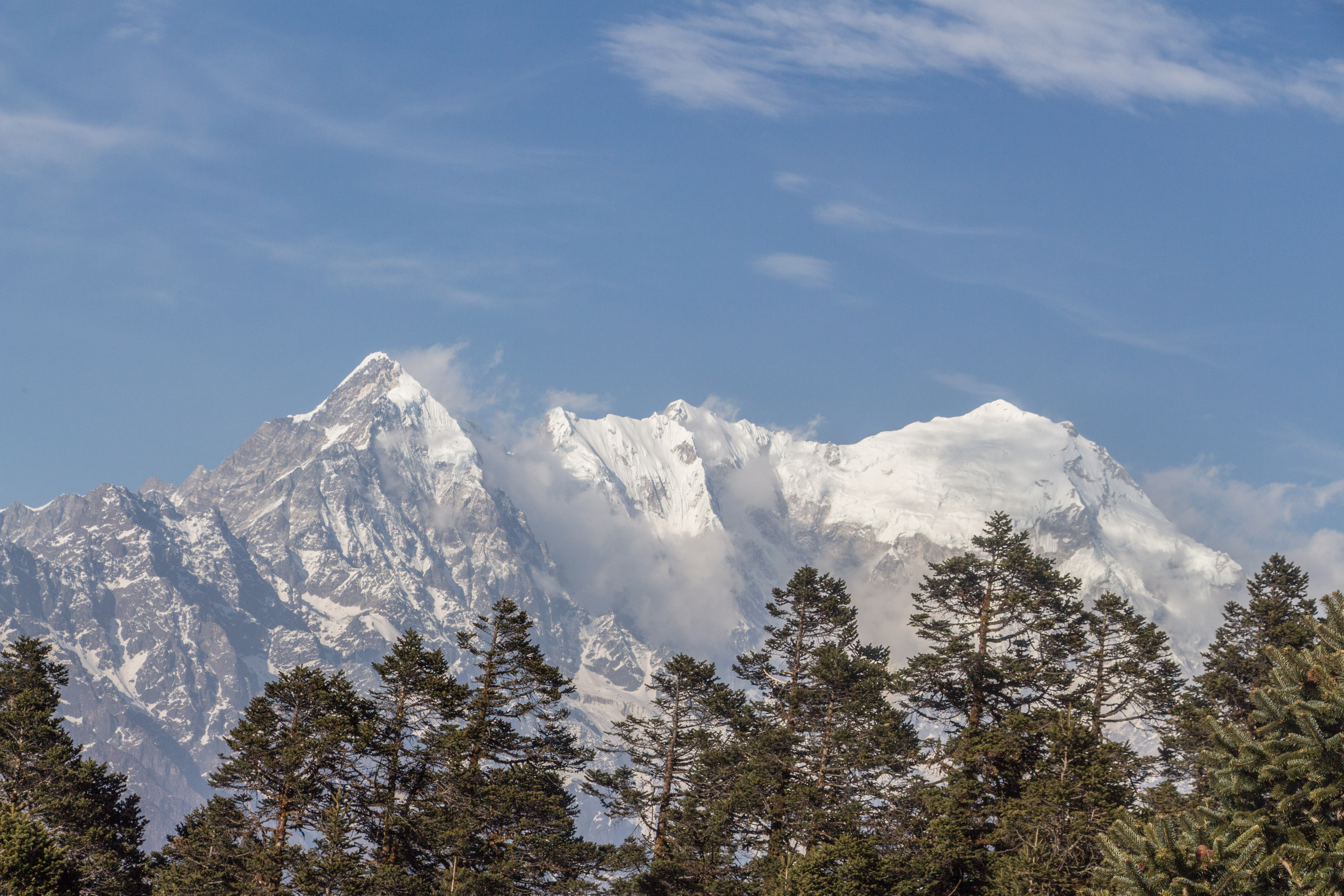
Ghenge Liru (left) and Langtang Lirung (right)

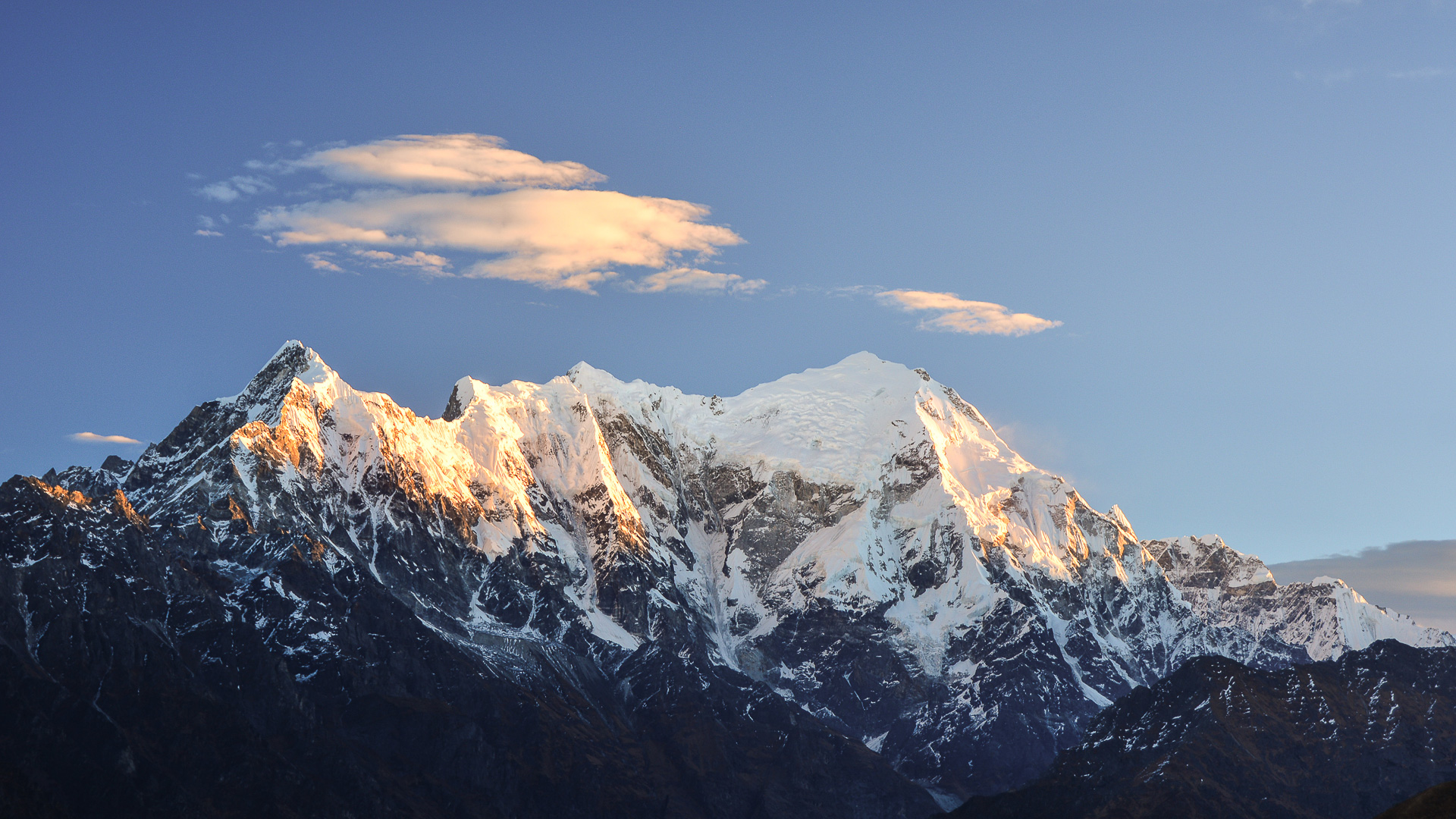
Ghenge Liru (left) and Langtang Lirung (right)

== See also ==
- Geology of the Himalayas
