= Langshisa Ri =

Mountain in Nepal

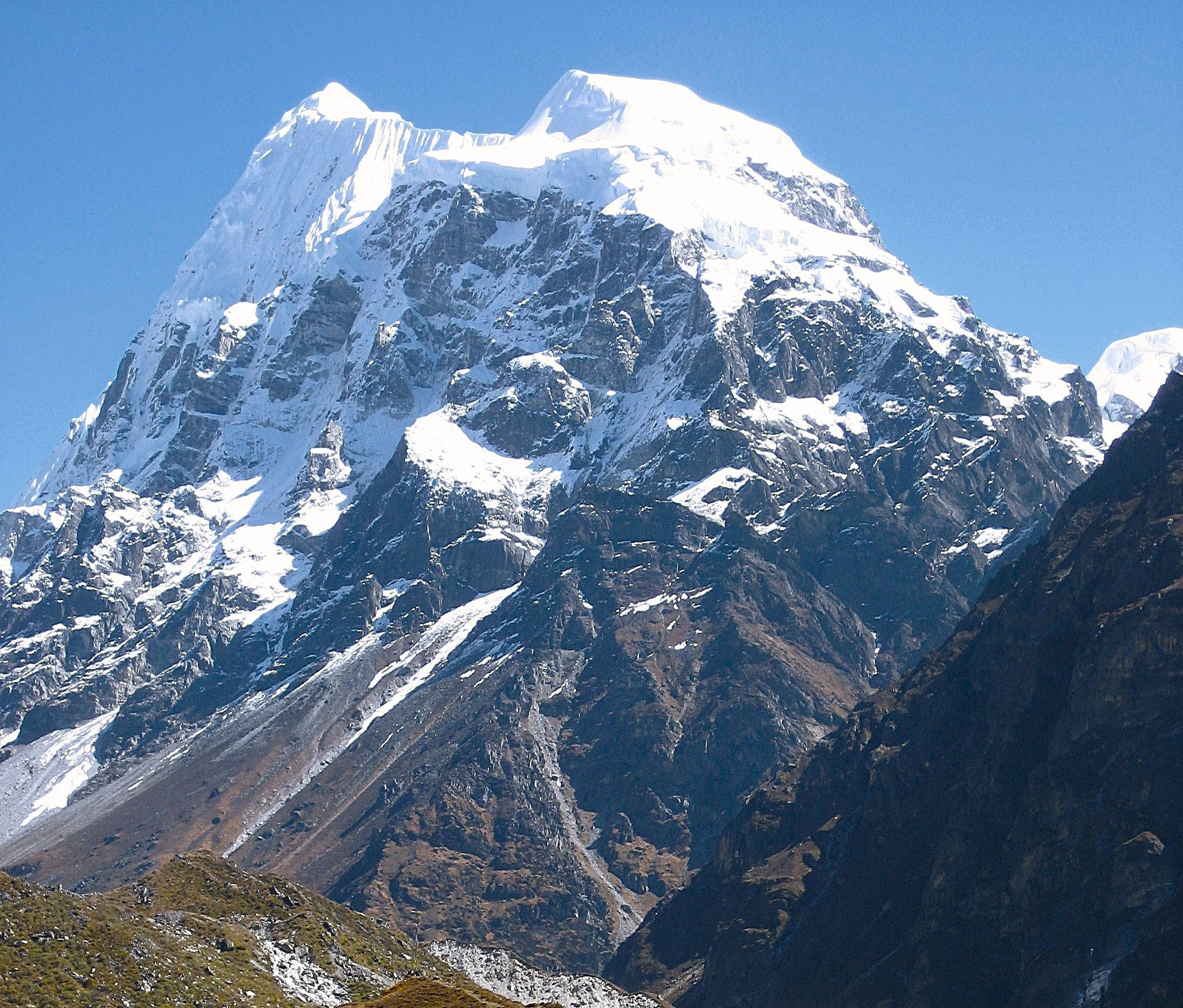
- West aspect

Highest point
- Elevation: 6,412 m (21,037 ft)
- Prominence: 930 m (3,051 ft)
- Isolation: 3.84 km (2.39 mi)
- Coordinates: 28°13′05″N 85°42′53″E

Geography
- Location within Nepal
- Interactive map of Langshisa Ri
- Country: Nepal
- Province: Bagmati
- District: Rasuwa
- Protected area: Langtang National Park
- Parent range: Himalayas; Jugal Himal

Climbing
- First ascent: 1982

Langshisa Ri, also spelled Langshisha Ri, is a mountain in Nepal.

== Description ==
Langshisa Ri is a 6,412-metre (21,037-foot) glaciated summit in the Langtang Valley of the Himalayas. It is situated 65 kilometres (40 mi) northeast of Kathmandu in Langtang National Park. Precipitation runoff from the mountain's slopes drains to the Trishuli River via Lānṭān Kholā. Topographic relief is significant as the summit rises 2,200 metres (7,218 ft) above Lānṭān Kholā in three kilometres (1.9 mi).

== Climbing history ==
The first ascent of the summit was achieved on April 23, 1982, by Takuya Kajimoto and Pasang Norbu Sherpa. In 1994, Vanja Furlan made a solo ascent of the west-northwest face. The central spur on the northwest face was first climbed in 2014 by Nikita Balabanov, Mikhail Formin, and Viacheslav Polezhaiko via a route they named Snow Queen. The mountain was added to the list of permitted trekking peaks in 2002.

== Climate ==
Based on the Köppen climate classification, Langshisa Ri is located in a tundra climate zone with cold, snowy winters, and cool summers. Weather systems coming off the Bay of Bengal are forced upwards by the Himalaya mountains (orographic lift), causing heavy precipitation in the form of rainfall and snowfall. Mid-June through early-August is the monsoon season. The months of April, May, September, and October offer the most favorable weather for viewing or climbing this peak.

== See also ==
- Geology of the Himalayas
