= Ondrej Húserka =

Slovak mountaineer (1990–2024)

Personal information
- Nationality: Slovak
- Born: 27 May 1990 Nemšová, Czechoslovakia
- Died: 31 October 2024 (aged 34) Langtang Valley, Nepal
- Website: www.ondrejhuserka.sk

Climbing career
- Known for: First climb Langtang Lirung East face

Ondrej Húserka (27 May 1990 – 31 October 2024) was a Slovak mountaineer.

In 2017, he made the first ascent of the 1000-metre-high west face of Alexander Block Peak in Kyrgyzstan. In 2019, he successfully climbed Cerro Torre.

In October 2024, he and Marek Holeček made the first ascent of the east face of Langtang Lirung in Nepal. He died during the descent after falling into glacier's crevasse. His body was retrieved a week later.
