= Naya Kanga =

Mountain in Nepal

- Ghanja La Chuli
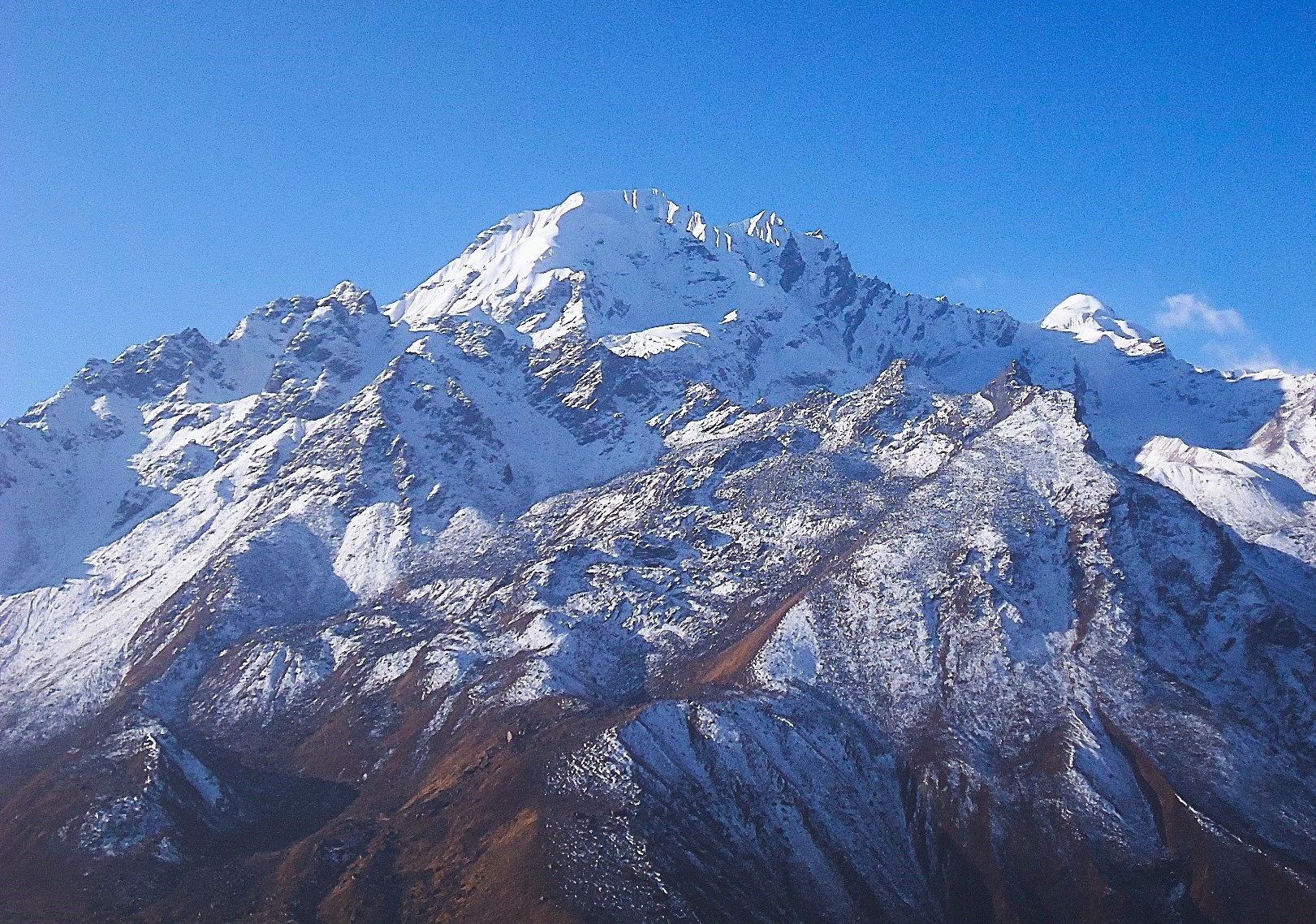
- North aspect

Highest point
- Elevation: 5,863 m (19,236 ft)
- Prominence: 709 m (2,326 ft)
- Isolation: 4.22 km (2.62 mi)
- Coordinates: 28°10′06″N 85°33′05″E

Geography
- Location within Nepal
- Interactive map of Naya Kanga
- Location: Langtang
- Country: Nepal
- Province: Bagmati
- District: Rasuwa / Sindhupalchowk
- Protected area: Langtang National Park
- Parent range: Himalayas

Climbing
- First ascent: Unknown
- Easiest route: Northeast Ridge

Naya Kanga, also known as Ghanja La Chuli, is a mountain in Nepal.

== Description ==
Naya Kanga is a 5,863-metre (19,236-foot) glaciated summit in the Nepali Himalayas. It is situated 55 kilometres (34 mi) north-northeast of Kathmandu above the Langtang Valley of Langtang National Park. Precipitation runoff from the mountain's north slope drains to the Trishuli River via Lānṭān Kholā, whereas the south slope drains to the Indravati River via Yāṅgri̇̄ Kholā. Topographic relief is significant as the summit rises 2,260 metres (7,415 ft) above the Langtang Valley in four kilometres (2.5 mi). This peak is on the list of permitted trekking peaks.

== Climate ==
Based on the Köppen climate classification, Naya Kanga is located in a tundra climate zone with cold, snowy winters, and cool summers. Weather systems coming off the Bay of Bengal are forced upwards by the Himalaya mountains (orographic lift), causing heavy precipitation in the form of rainfall and snowfall. Mid-June through early-August is the monsoon season. The months of March, April, May, September, October, and November offer the most favorable weather for viewing or climbing this peak.

== Gallery ==
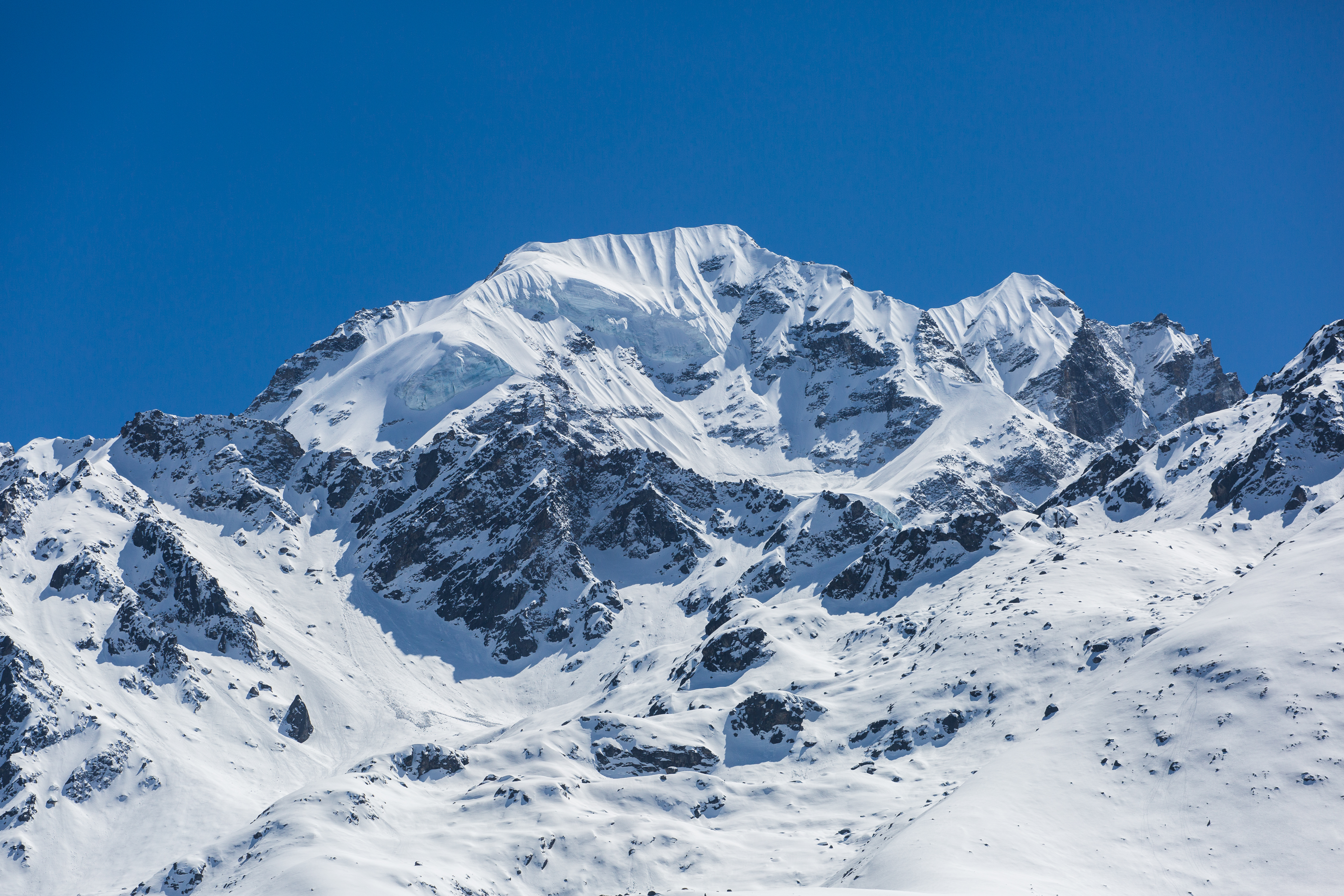

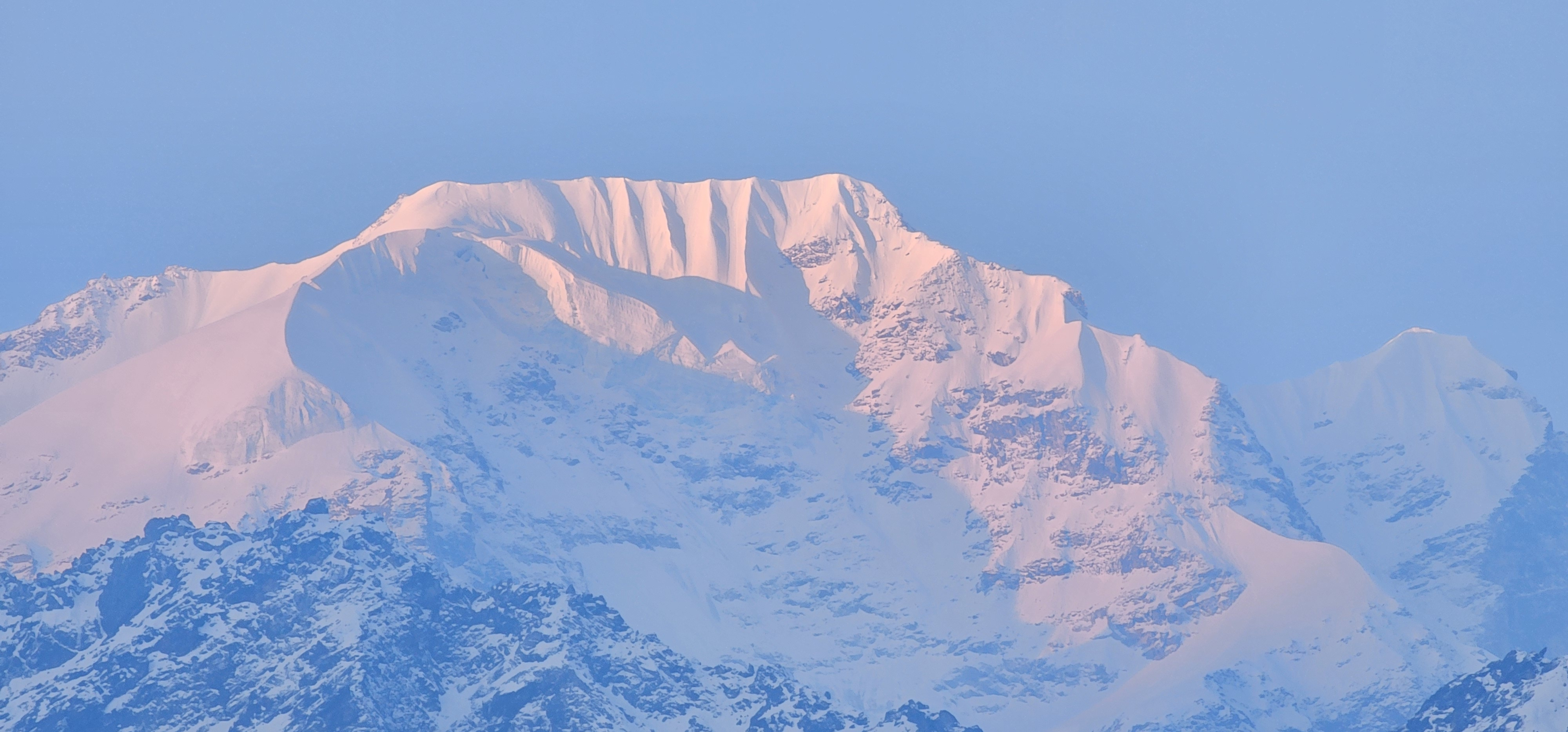

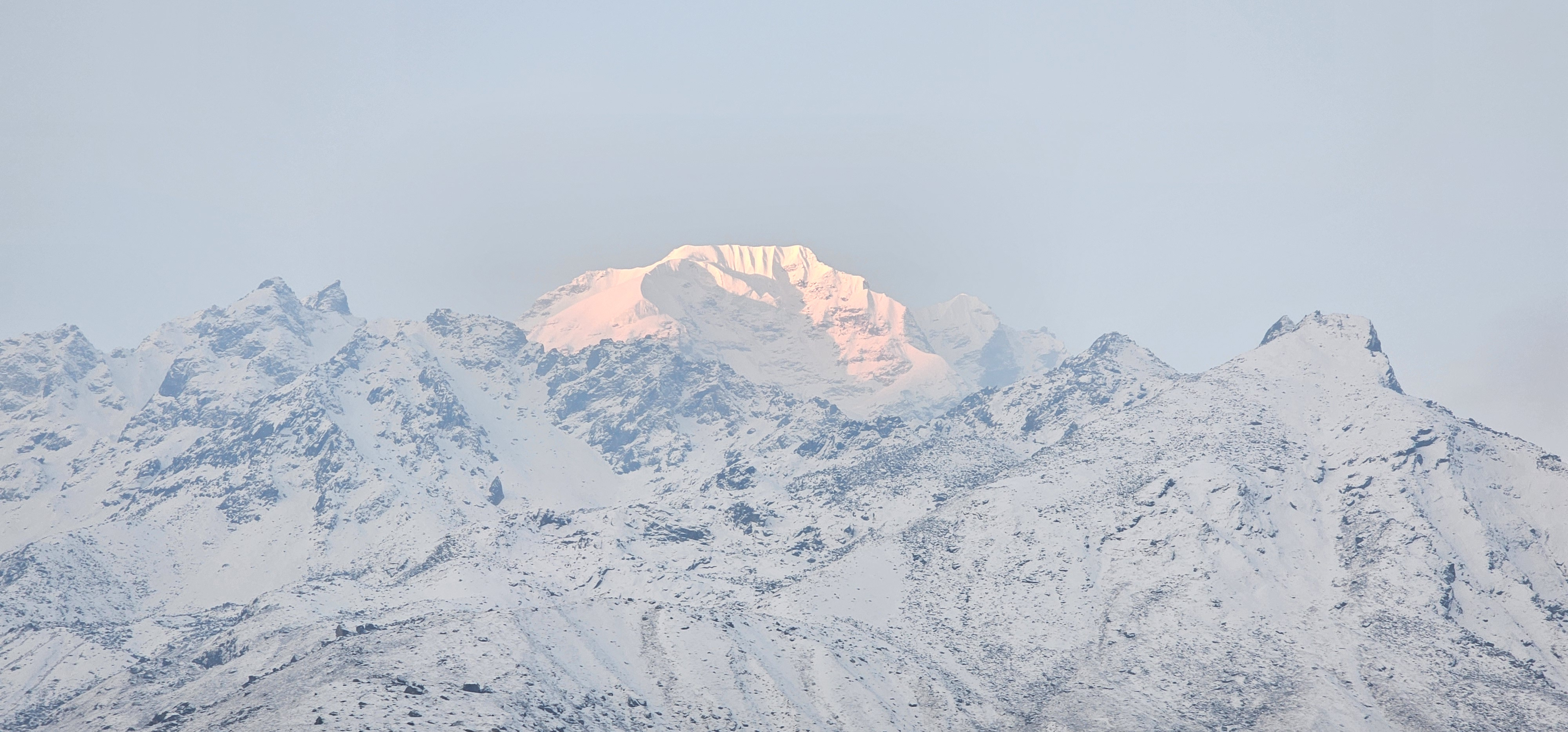

== See also ==
- Geology of the Himalayas
