= Tawoyan =

Tawoyan may refer to:

- Tawoyan people, an ethnic group of Indonesia
- Tawoyan language, their language

== See also ==
- Lawangan (disambiguation)
