= Langman (surname) =

Langman is a surname and may refer to:

- Harrie Langman (1931–2016), Dutch politician
- Ida Kaplan Langman (1904–1991), Russian-born American botanist
- Laura Langman (born 1986), New Zealand international netball player
- Neil Langman (born 1932), retired English footballer
- Nicholas Langman (born 1960), officer for the British secret service organisation MI6
- Peter F. Langman (born 1960), American counseling psychologist and author
- Ron Langman, South Australian photographer, businessperson and entrepreneur
- Sarah Langman (born 1995), Australian soccer player
- Steven Langman, chairman and co-founder of the Rhône Group, the private-equity firm

== See also ==
- Longman (surname)
