= Path of the Mani =

Road in Nepal

The Path of the Mani is an ancient high-road from Kathmandu, Nepal, to the mountain pass of Langtang between the valleys of Nepal and the dry highlands of the Tibetan Plateau.
