= Yala Glacier =

Glacier in Nepal

- Location within Nepal
- Location: Rasuwa District, Nepal
- Coordinates: 28.22°N 85.65°E
- Area: 1.61 square kilometres (0.62 sq mi)
- Length: 1.4 mi (2.3 km)
- Highest elevation: 5,750 metres (18,860 ft)
- Lowest elevation: 5,170 metres (16,960 ft)

Yala Glacier is a glacier in Rasuwa District, Nepal. 'Yala' means 'high peak' in the local Langtang valley language.

It was described in 2006 as a 2,566 square kilometres (991 sq mi) plateau-shaped polythermal glacier. In 2021, the length was 1.4 km (0.87 mi) with a surface area of 1.61 km^{2} (0.62 sq mi).

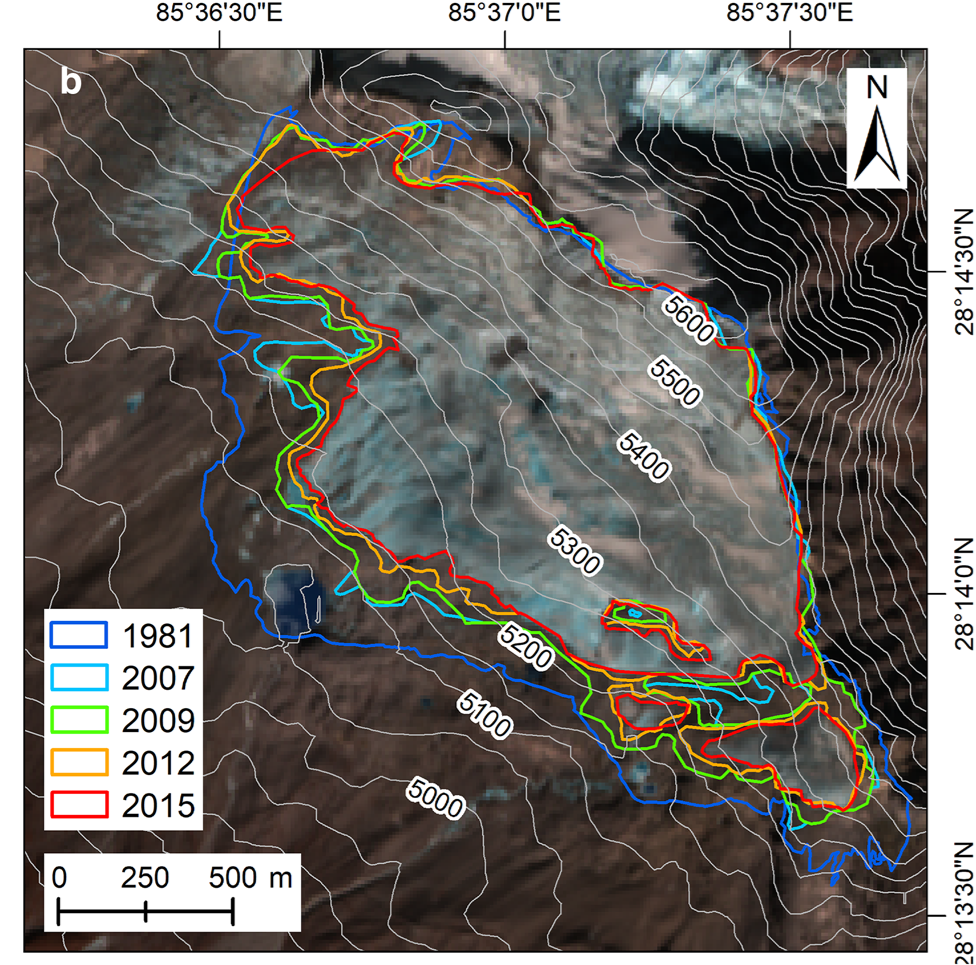
Map of Yala Glacier and its boundaries in 1981, 2007, 2009, 2012 and 2015

Due to its relative accessibility, the glacier is one of the most studied in Nepal, starting with Japanese glaciologists. Researchers have found that the glacier rapidly retreated since the 1990s. Since 1974 the surface area of the glacier dropped 66% and the glacier retreated 784 meters.

In 2025, during a 'glacier funeral' ceremony, a memorial for the glacier was unveiled to acknowledge it rapid disappearance. It consists of a granite plaque with inscription by Icelandic writer Andri Snær Magnason.

== See also ==
- International Centre for Integrated Mountain Development
