= Tsangbu Ri =

Mountain peak in Langtang region

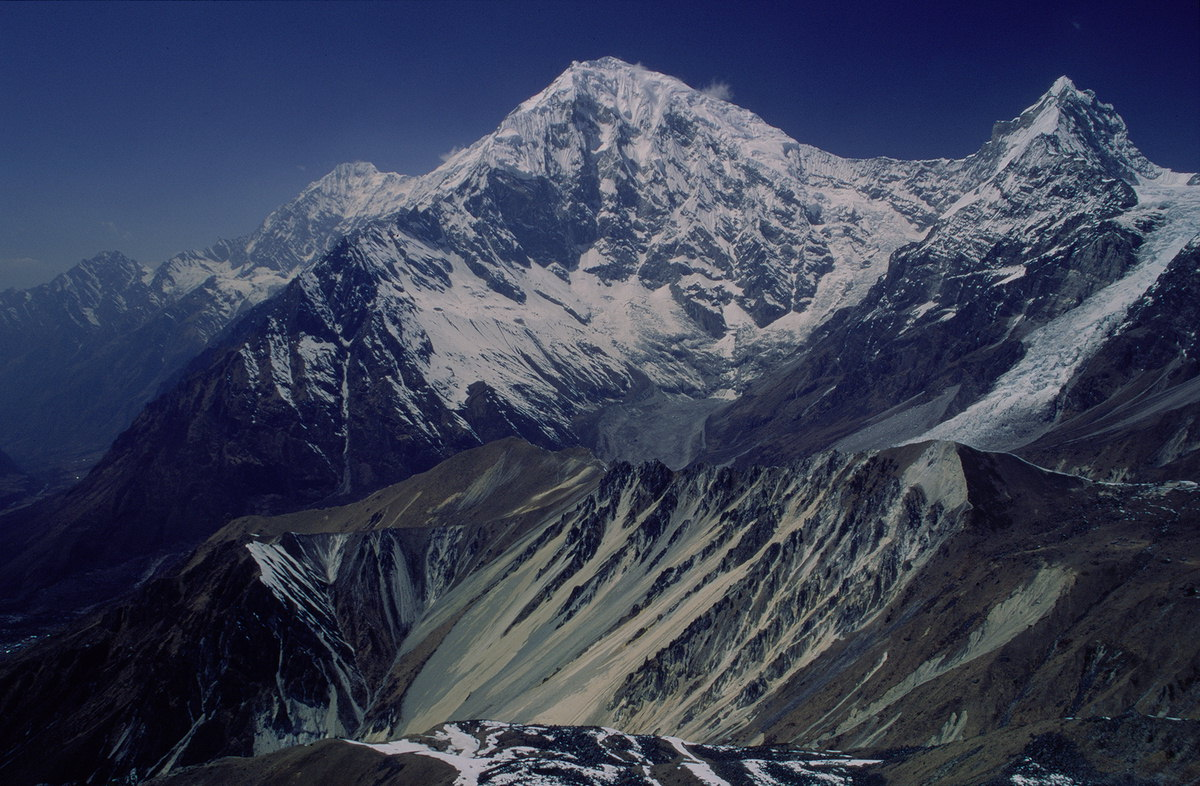
- Langtang Lirung in center and Tsangbu Ri in right, as seen from Tsergo Ri

Highest point
- Elevation: 6,781 m (22,247 ft)
- Prominence: 561 m (1,841 ft)
- Coordinates: 28°16′20″N 85°33′06″E

Geography
- Location within Nepal Location within Tibet Location within China Location within Asia
- Country: Nepal
- Parent range: Himalayas

Climbing
- First ascent: October 20, 2025

Tsangbu Ri (also known as Kimshung) is a mountain peak in the Himalayas, located on the border of Bagmati Province of Nepal and the Tibet Autonomous Region of China.

== Location ==
The mountain peak lies north of the Langtang Khola river valley in Langtang National Park at 6,781 m (22,247 ft) above sea level. The border to China is just 2 km north of the summit. Along the east flank, the Kimshung Glacier extends into the Langtang Valley, and along the west side, the Lirung Glacier. In the west, Langtang Lirung is located at a distance of 4 km.

== Climbing history ==
The first ascent of Kimshung was achieved on October 20, 2025, by a rope team consisting of four people. The first climbers were Benjamin Zörer from Austria, Lukas Waldner from South Tyrol, and François Cazzanelli and Giuseppe Vidoni, both from Italy.

=== Attempts ===
- In 2017, Swiss climbing duo Alex Gammeter and Philipp Bührer made an attempt via Kimshung Glacier.
- In 2024, the Italian climbing team from the Aosta Valley, including François Cazzanelli, Roger Bovard, Emrik Favre, Jérôme Perruquet, Stefano Stradelli, Francesco Ratti and Giuseppe Vidoni. They named the AI3/4+ route the Arête des amoureux (French for “The Lovers Ridge”) after Aostan World Cup skier Jean-Daniel Pession and his girlfriend, Elisa Arlian, who died together in a mountain accident earlier in 2024.
