= Langtang, Rasuwa =

Langtang, Bagmati लाङटाङ
- Village development committee
- Location in Nepal
- Coordinates: 28°12′59″N 85°30′22″E
- Country: Nepal
- Zone: Bagmati Zone
- District: Rasuwa District

Population (1991)
  - Total: 468
- Time zone: UTC+5:45 (Nepal Time)

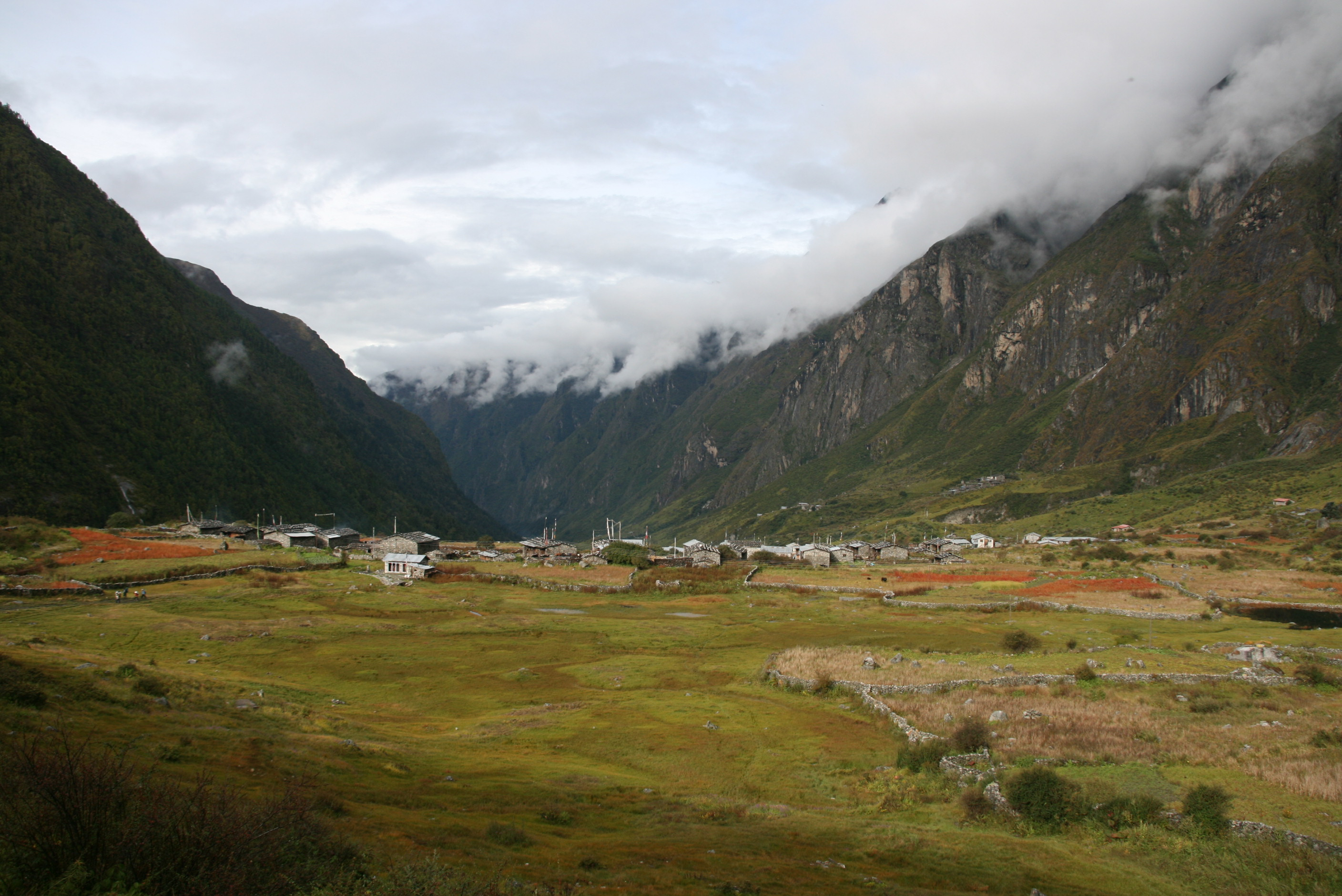
Langtang village before destruction by avalanche caused by an earthquake in 2015

Langtang is a village development committee (VDC) in Rasuwa District in the Bagmati Zone of northern Nepal. It was located within the Langtang valley, approximately 40 miles northeast of Kathmandu. At the time of the 1991 Nepal census, it had a population of 468 people living in 100 individual households.

== History ==
Langtang Village is thought to have been first settled by ethnic Tibetans in approximately the 15th century. Local legends state that a traveling Buddhist Lama was chasing an escaped yak when he spotted the fertile valley. For most of its history, Langtang Village depended on subsistence agriculture.

Tourism in Langtang began in the 1970s, increasing economic opportunities for the residents. Located between several 20,000 foot mountains with summits 8,000 to 10,000 feet above the village, Langtang became a popular destination among trekkers due to its scenic natural landscape and proximity to features such as the mountain of Langtang Lirung and several glacial lakes in Langtang National Park. Right up until its destruction in 2015, Langtang valley and the village of Langtang were thought to be one of the most beautiful valleys in the Himalayas. It saw an average of 20,000 visitors a year, making it Nepal's third most popular trekking area.

== Government ==
The purpose of Village Development Committees is to organise village people structurally at a local level and to create a partnership between the community and the public sector for improved service delivery system. A VDC has a status as an autonomous institution and authority for interacting with the more centralised institutions of governance in Nepal. In doing so, the VDC gives village people an element of control and responsibility in development, and also ensures proper utilization and distribution of state funds and a greater interaction between government officials, NGOs and agencies. The village development committees within a given area will discuss education, water supply, basic health, sanitation, and income and will also monitor and record progress which is displayed in census data.

In VDCs, there is one elected chief, usually elected with over an 80% majority. From each ward, there is also a chief that is elected along with these there are also four members elected or nominated.

Prior to the 2015 Nepal earthquake, there was a clinic located in Langtang, which served the local villages. Prior to 2000, there was no medical care available in the region.

== 2015 Nepal earthquake ==
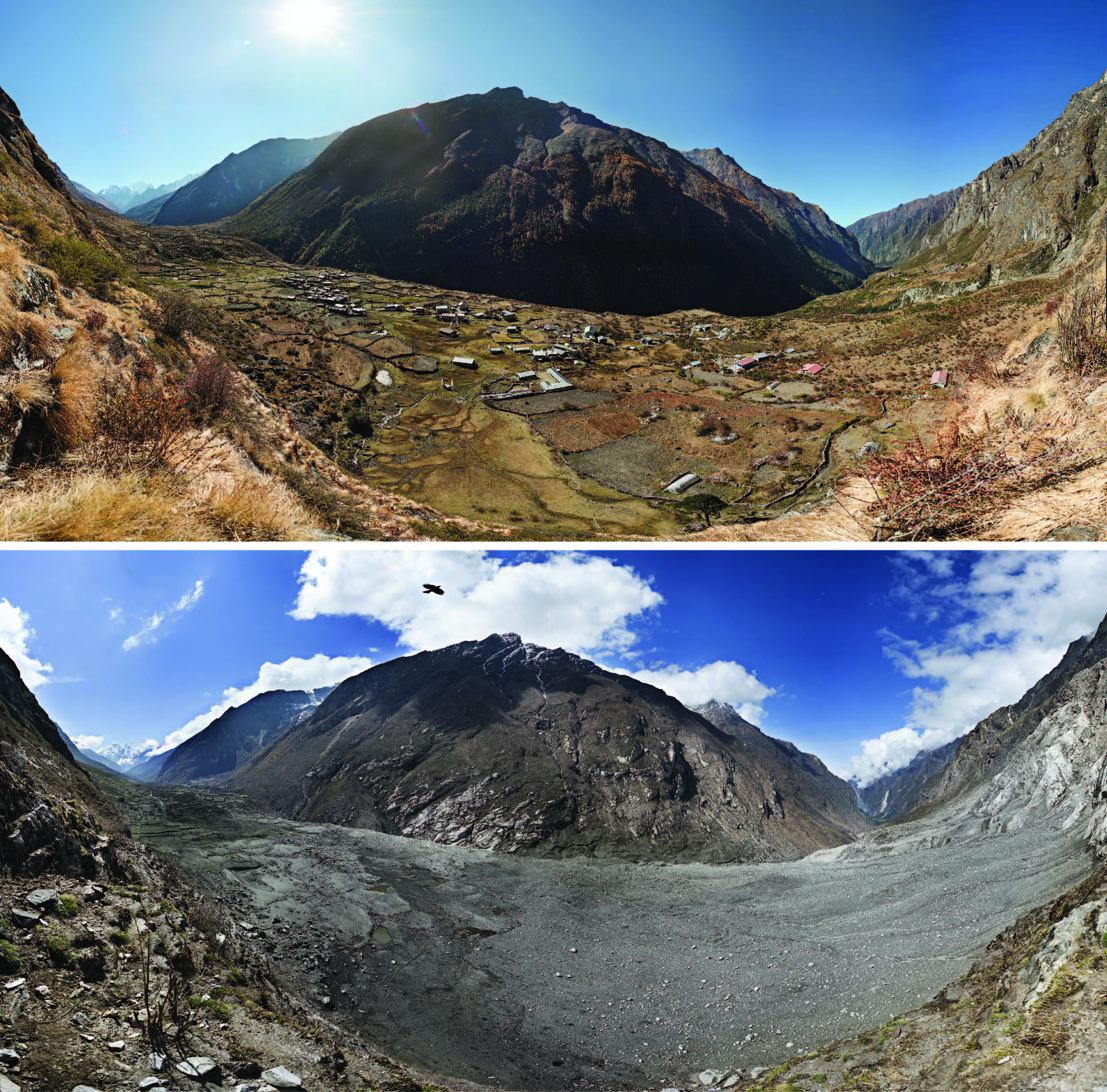
Images of Langtang village taken before and after the earthquake

The village was entirely destroyed by a massive avalanche resulting from an earthquake on 25 April 2015, during the height of tourist season in the valley. The night before the earthquake, locals from villages throughout the valley had gathered in Langtang's monastery for a ghewa ceremony to mourn the recent death of a village resident. A large overhanging glacier was struck loose during the earthquake, sending debris down the valley. The disaster also included a landslide and pressure wave that flattened part of the village and many nearby trees. Langtang village was feared to be the hardest hit village in Nepal, due to its location in the valley and proximity to the epicenter. The neighboring village of Kyanjin Gompa, located further up the valley, was also badly damaged, though not as much as Langtang. Reportedly, even survivors who had been in nearby villages during the event were shocked by the magnitude of destruction at Langtang.

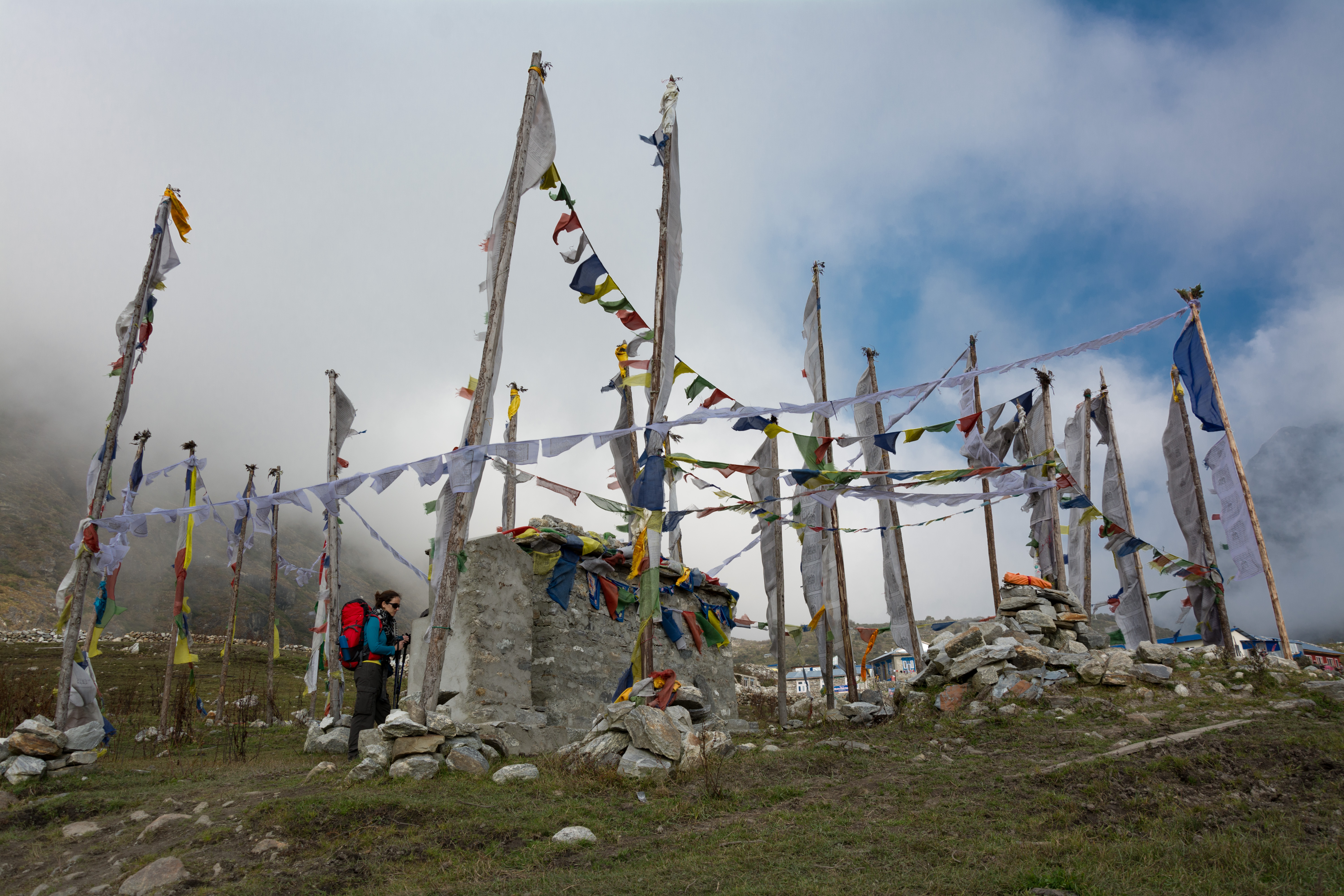
The memorial erected in Langtang, covered in Buddhist prayer flags

Reports from the area indicated that the village had only one structure remaining, a house that was sheltered beneath an overhang, and significant parts of the village were buried beneath a landslide. As of 1 May 2015 most of the village's inhabitants were "presumed to have perished". While awaiting rescue, relations among survivors grew tense after locals accused several foreigners of looting the wreckage of houses. By 6 May 2015, survivors searching the rubble had recovered 53 bodies. However, even several months after the village was destroyed, approximately 100 bodies were still unrecovered. After 4 days stranded in the valley due to aftershocks, surviving tourists and locals at Langtang were rescued by helicopter. The official death toll lists 310 deaths, 176 of which were village residents and 80 of which were foreigners.

In the aftermath of the disaster, survivors were evacuated to Kathmandu, though many continued to return to search for loved ones who were still missing. Many later returned to the valley, although others remained unhoused in Kathmandu. Although the original village at Langtang remains a barren site several years after the disaster, new buildings had been erected in the valley close to the original site by 2017, including several guest houses. The site of the old village contains a memorial to those who perished. However, after the earthquake, many tourists began to bypass Langtang for the less heavily impacted Kyanjin Gompa. Locals have expressed fears that the lack of tourism will force them to return to subsistence farming.

Eight years after the earthquake, the renovation of the Langtang village has been completed. The new settlement has shifted about 500 meters away from the original village, and a new settlement has been built from scratch. About 150 families reside in the village and all of them were provided with new homes. Now there are more than 15 hotels for travellers, all built with earthquake-resistant materials, thus making it more comfortable for tourists than before. Kyanjin Gompa also has new hotels and better facilities for the accommodation of locals and tourists.

Langtang village can now accommodate 1500 tourists at a time while Kyanjin Gompa can accommodate over 2000 tourists at a time. Himalayan Climate Initiative (HCI Nepal) launched the biggest initiative for rebuilding the infrastructure of Langtang, including the Mundu primary school.
