= Langtang Lirung =

Highest peak of Langtang Himal

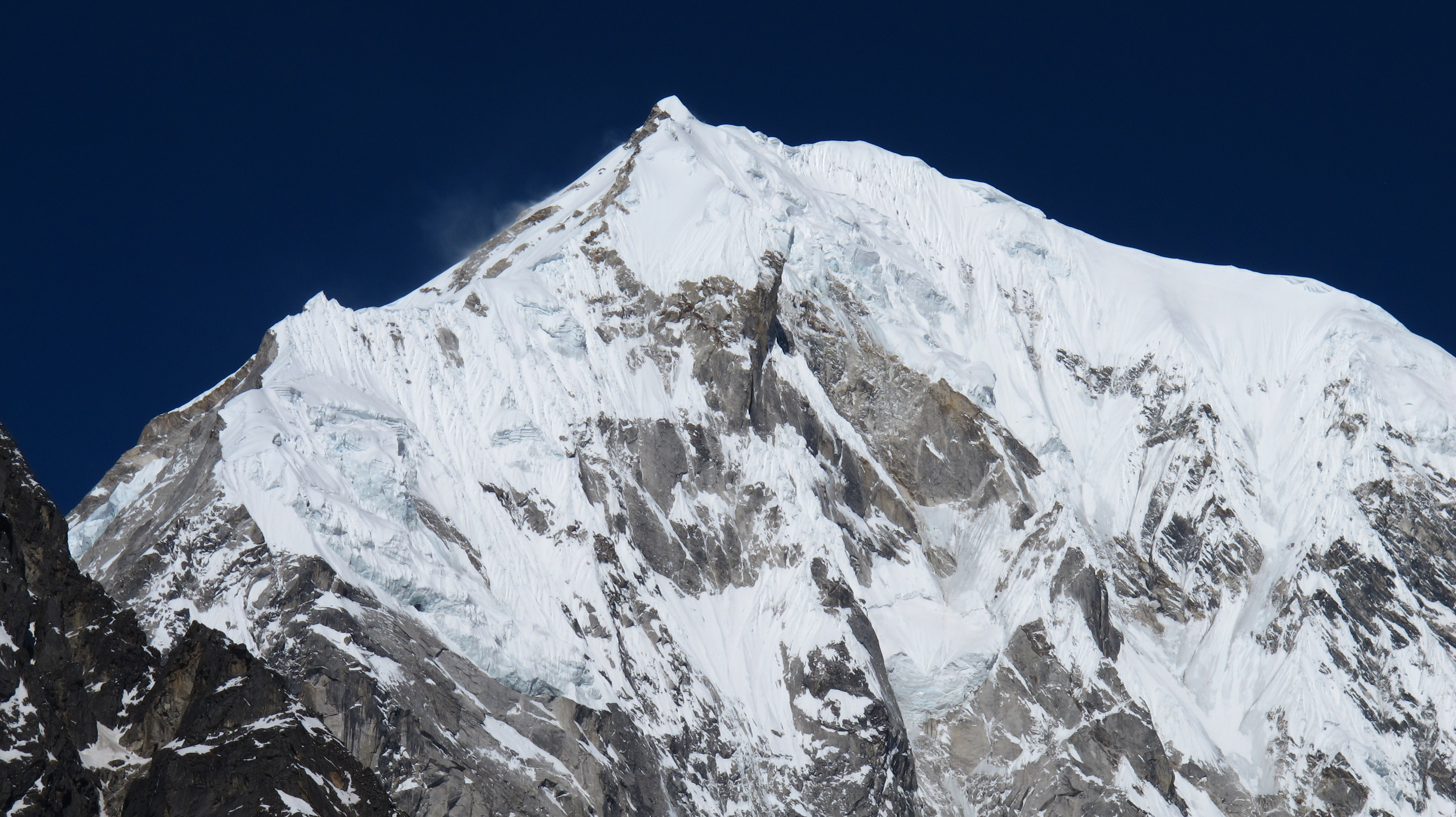
- Langtang Lirung in 2020 (view from south-east)

Highest point
- Elevation: 7,234 m (23,734 ft); Ranked 98th
- Prominence: 1,534 m (5,033 ft)
- Listing: Ultra
- Coordinates: 28°15′27″N 85°30′57″E

Geography
- Location within Nepal
- Location: Langtang, Nepal
- Parent range: Langtang Himal

Climbing
- First ascent: October 24, 1978 by Seishi Wada and Pemba Tsering Sherpa
- Easiest route: rock/snow/ice climb

Langtang Lirung is the highest peak of the Langtang Himal, which is a subrange of the Nepalese Himalayas, southwest of the Eight-thousander Shishapangma. It is listed as the 99th highest mountain in the world.

== Location ==
The Langtang Himal forms the western portion of a complex of mountains which also includes the Jugal Himal, home of Shishapangma. This complex lies between the Sun Kosi valley on the east and the Trisuli Gandaki valley on the west. Langtang Lirung lies near the Trisuli Gandaki, and north of the Langtang Khola. At a distance of four kilometres towards the east, Tsangbu Ri is located, and Ghenge Liru is four kilometres to the west.

== Features ==
Though not high by the standards of major Himalayan peaks, Langtang Lirung is notable for its large vertical relief above local terrain. For example, it rises 5,500 metres (18,000 ft) above the Trisuli Gandaki to the west in only 16 kilometres (9.9 mi). It has a large south face which long resisted climbing attempts.

== Climbing history ==
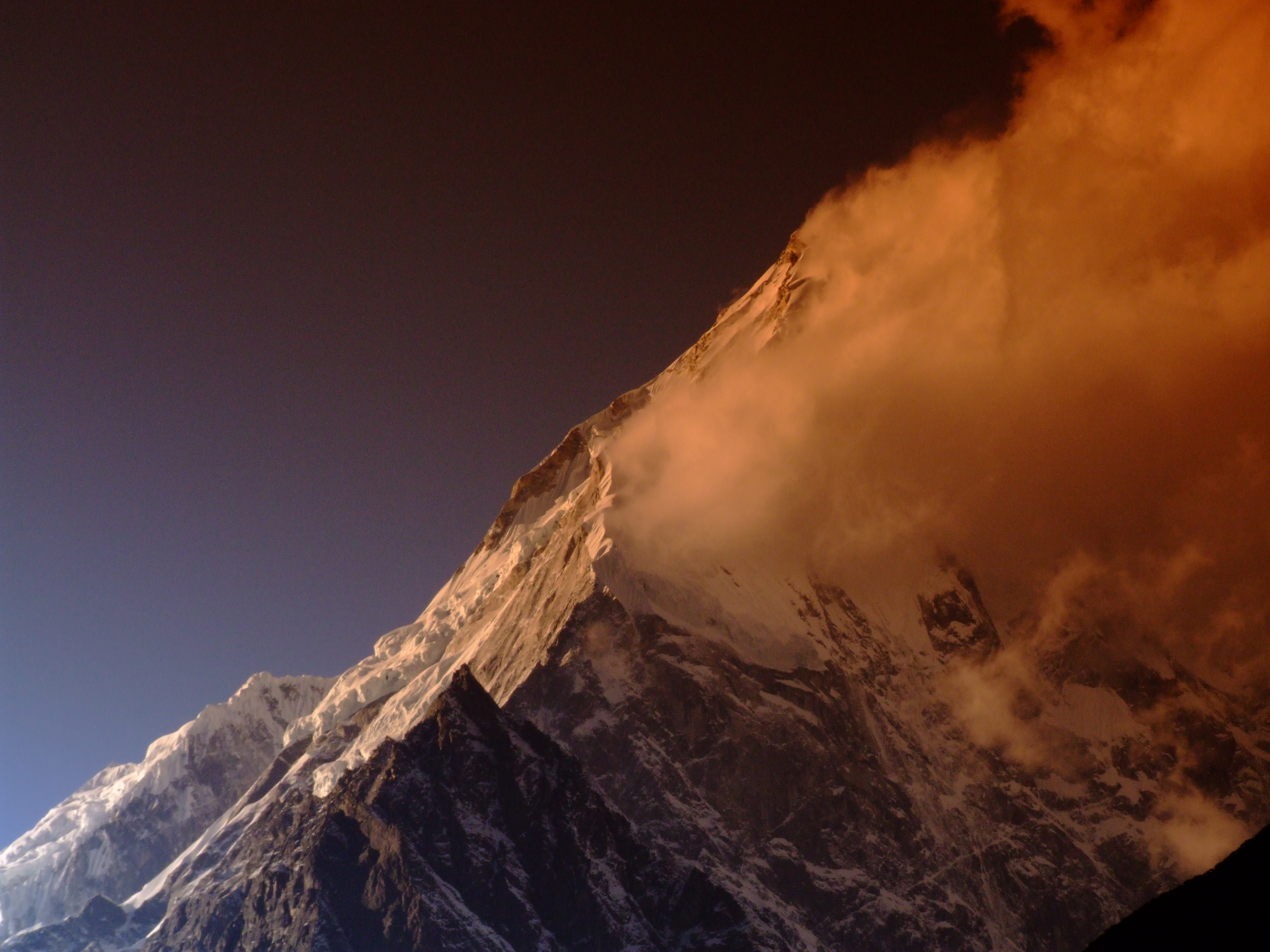
Langtang Lirung

The peak was reconnoitered by H. W. Tilman and P. Lloyd in 1949. Attempts were made to climb the peak via the East Ridge in the 1960s, but none got close to the summit.

On October 24, 1978, Seishi Wada and Pemba Tsering Sherpa from a Japanese expedition made the first ascent of the mountain via the East Ridge.

Poles made the first winter ascent. On 3 January 1988 Mikołaj Czyżewski, Kazimierz Kiszka and Adam Potoczek stood at the summit.

According to the Himalayan Index, there have been 14 ascents of Langtang Lirung (in 1978, 1980, 1981, 1982, 1986, 1988, 1989, 1992, 1994, and 1995), mostly by the Southeast or Southwest Ridge routes; and 13 unsuccessful attempts on the peak (these may be underestimates).

On 29 March 1990, an avalanche hit an eight-member Japanese climbing team who was ascending the mountain via the southeast ridge. Four climbers were caught and carried 600 meters. Only one member of them was able to free himself; the three others, Noriyuki Futami, Yasuhisa Kuwashina and Masahiro Hisamoto, were killed.

On 9 November 2009, Slovenian mountaineer Tomaž Humar, who was on a solo climb (the expedition started on 5 October) via the South Face, had an accident during his descent. Sources report that he became stuck on the mountain at an approximate height of 6300 meters with a broken leg (other sources also report broken ribs and damaged spine). His only contact with the base camp staff via a satellite phone was made on the day of the accident, and he appeared to be in a critical condition. The rescue party found his body on 14 November at the height of 5,600 metres (18,400 ft). Presumably, he died on 9 or 10 November.

On 30 October 2024 Czech climber Marek Holeček and his Slovak partner Ondrej Húserka achieved the first successful ascent of Langtang Lirung via the peak's east face. Ondrej died during the descent on October 31 after falling into glacier's crevasse. Marek reached him alive and attempted to pull him out before realizing Ondrej's injuries were too serious, however, and he died hours later.

== Glacier collapses ==
On 25 April 2015, a glacier collapse induced by a magnitude 7.8 earthquake resulted in an ice and debris slide from the southwest-facing slope of the mountain into Langtang Valley, destroying Langtang village. The avalanches in Langtang Valley killed almost 400 people in total. Reconstruction efforts commenced soon after, with new hotels opening in the rebuilt settlement by 2017.

On 26 August 2026, a glacier on the north slope of Langtang Lirung collapsed and caused catastrophic flash flooding along Trishuli River that devastated dozens of settlements in Nepal and adjacent China.

== See also ==
- List of highest mountains on Earth
- List of ultras of the Himalayas

== Sources ==
- H. Adams Carter, "Classification of the Himalaya," American Alpine Journal 1985.
- Neate, Jill (1989). High Asia: An Illustrated History of the 7000 Metre Peaks. Seattle: The Mountaineers. ISBN 0-89886-238-8.
- Himalayan Index
- DEM files for the Himalaya (Corrected versions of SRTM data)
