= Längtan =

Längtan may refer to:

- Längtan (Scotts album) (2009)
- Längtan (Timoteij album) (2010)
- Langtan, Qing commander at the Siege of Albazin (1685 and 1686)

== See also ==
- Langtang (disambiguation)
