= Lawangan =

Lawangan may refer to:

- Lawangan language, an Austronesian language of Indonesia
- Lawangan people, the speakers of the language

== See also ==
- Tawoyan (disambiguation)
