= Lancman =

Lancman is a surname. Notable people with the surname include:

- Eli Lancman (1936–2024), Israeli historian of Japanese and East Asian art
- Rory Lancman (born 1969), American politician, member of the New York City Council (2014–2020)
- Sarah Lancman (born 1989), French jazz singer, pianist, composer, author, and performer
