= Langmeing =

Langmeing is a village in Mon district of Nagaland state of India.
