= Nicholas Langman =

British intelligence officer

Nicholas John Andrew Langman CMG (born 1960) is an officer for the British secret service organisation MI6.

Langman was also implicated in the various MI6-scenarios related to Diana, Princess of Wales. UK authorities issued censorship orders forbidding the press from publishing his name.

During 2005, he was the head of MI6 at the British Embassy in Athens. In December 2005, the Greek newspaper Proto Thema reported that Langman had taken part in the Greek intelligence service's kidnapping and torture of 28 men of Pakistani origin. The US Embassy in London clarified statements made by Ambassador Robert Tuttle, who told BBC Radio 4 Today that there was no evidence that suspects had been transferred to Syria under a "special rendition". While acknowledging reports of rendition to Syria, the embassy declined to comment further. News outlets in more than 50 countries published the news, provoking a strong reaction from the British ministry of foreign affairs, which forbade the British media from publishing any personal information regarding the identity of the three agents. The French newspaper Libération titled “Barbaric interrogations in Greece” and Le Monde “A case of illegal interrogations of Pakistani immigrants in Greece puts London and Athens in a difficult position”. “After the Americans, the British?” the Monde wrote, noting that the case had implications for “Greek Prime Minister and Anglophile Kostas Karamanlis, who has studied in Britain”. In an interview he gave to a newspaper, Karamanlis as “the head of the Greek Right had assured that the fight against terrorism must not weaken the Charter of the United Nations and international law”.

Although British media were requested to not reveal Langman's name, (a standing D-Notice (or in modern terms, a DSMA notice) provides a request only) against printing the names of serving intelligence officers is a request to publishers only), on 30 December 2005 the British Newspaper The Morning Star ran a front-page article naming him. In its 7 January 2006 edition, the British Newspaper Socialist Worker also named him. The British satirical magazine Private Eye also named Langman in its January 2006 edition.

Langman was appointed Companion of the Order of St Michael and St George (CMG) in the 2017 New Year Honours for services to British foreign policy.
