= Lanagan =

Lanagan is a surname. Notable people with the surname include:

- James F. Lanagan (1878–1937), American football, rugby, and baseball coach
- Margo Lanagan (born 1960), Australian writer

== See also ==
- Lanagan, Missouri, town in Missouri
