= Langtang =

Region in Nepal

Coordinates: 28.250°N 85.500°E

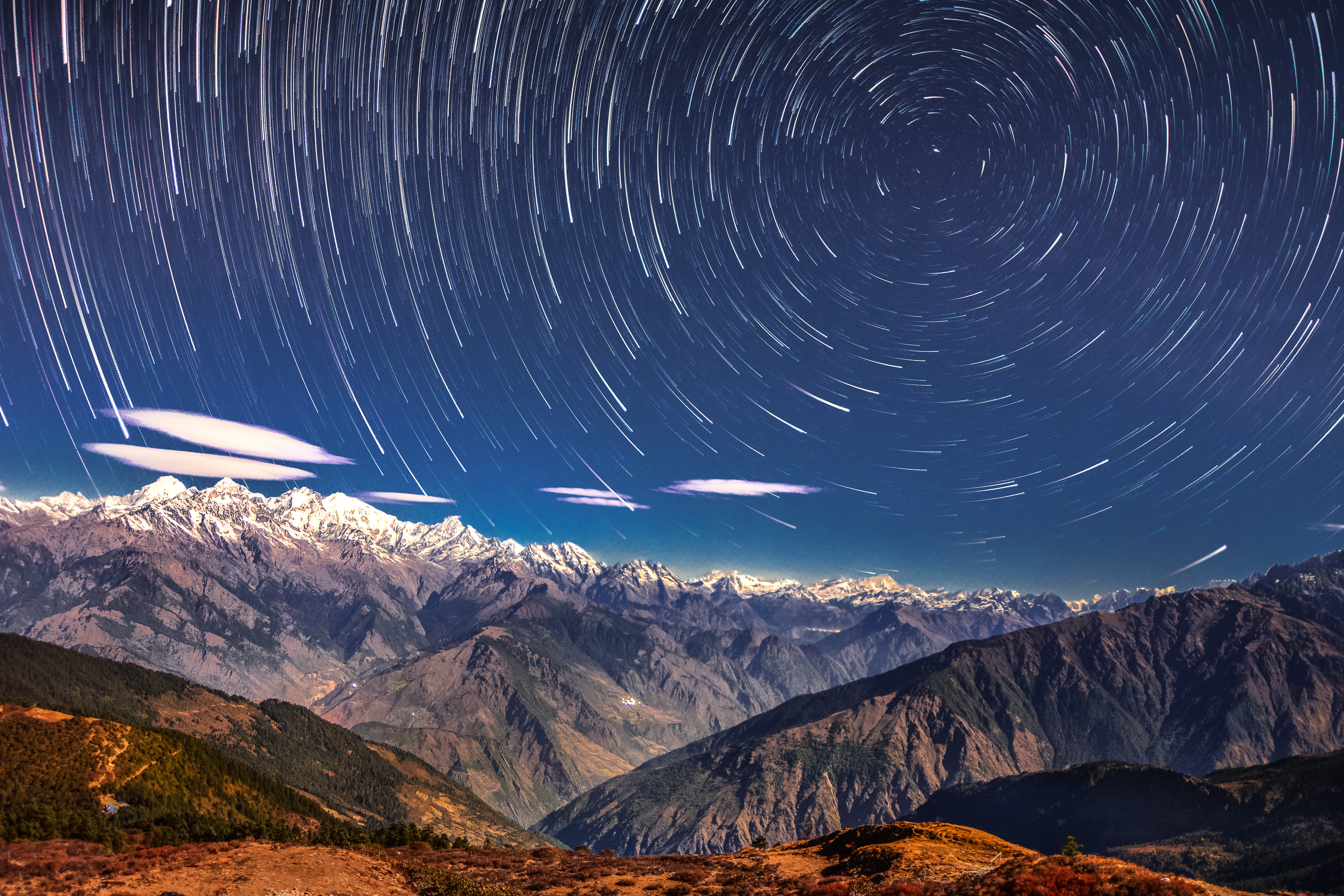
Starry night in Langtang National Park, view to Ganesh Himal

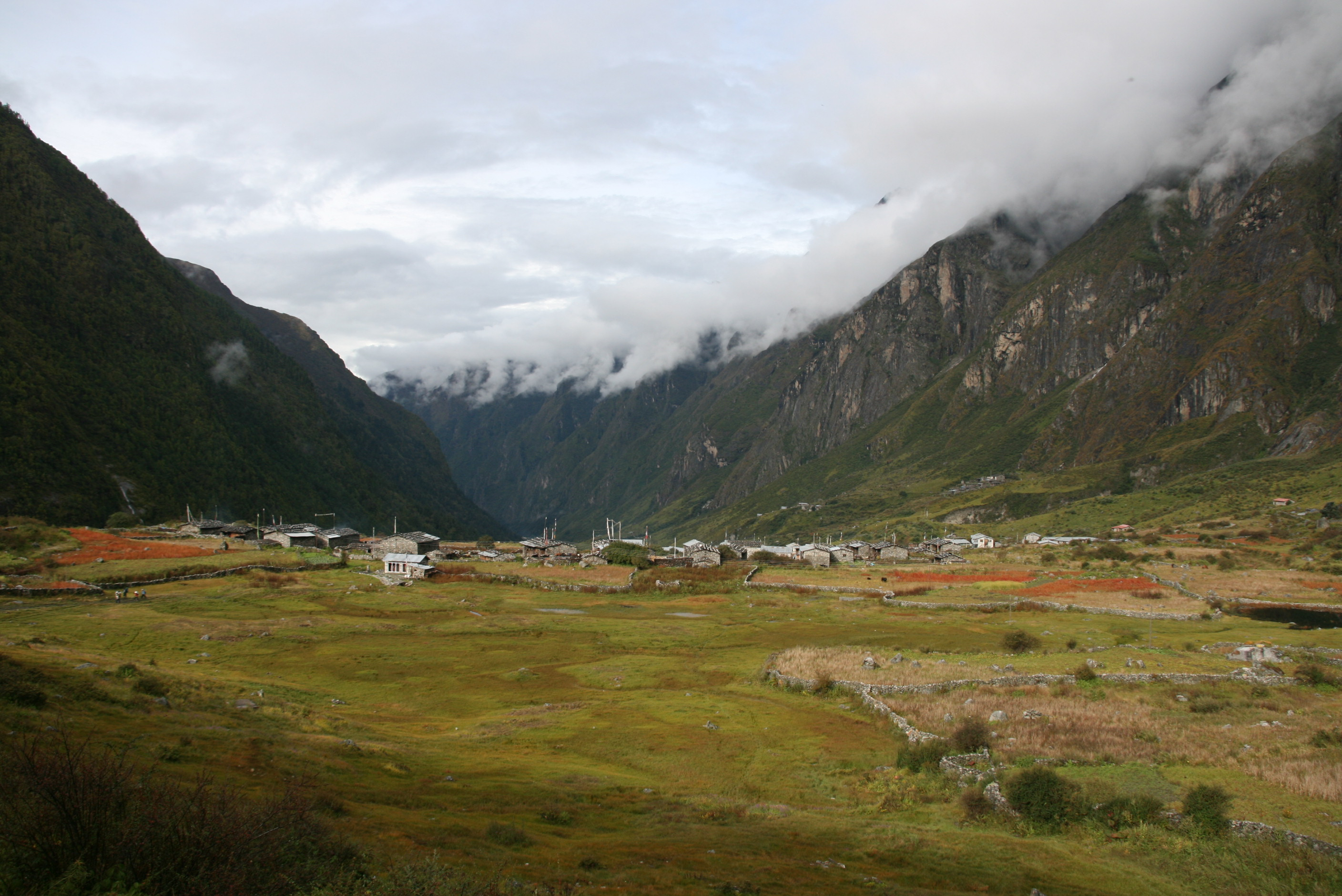
Langtang village before it was destroyed by an avalanche caused by an earthquake in 2015

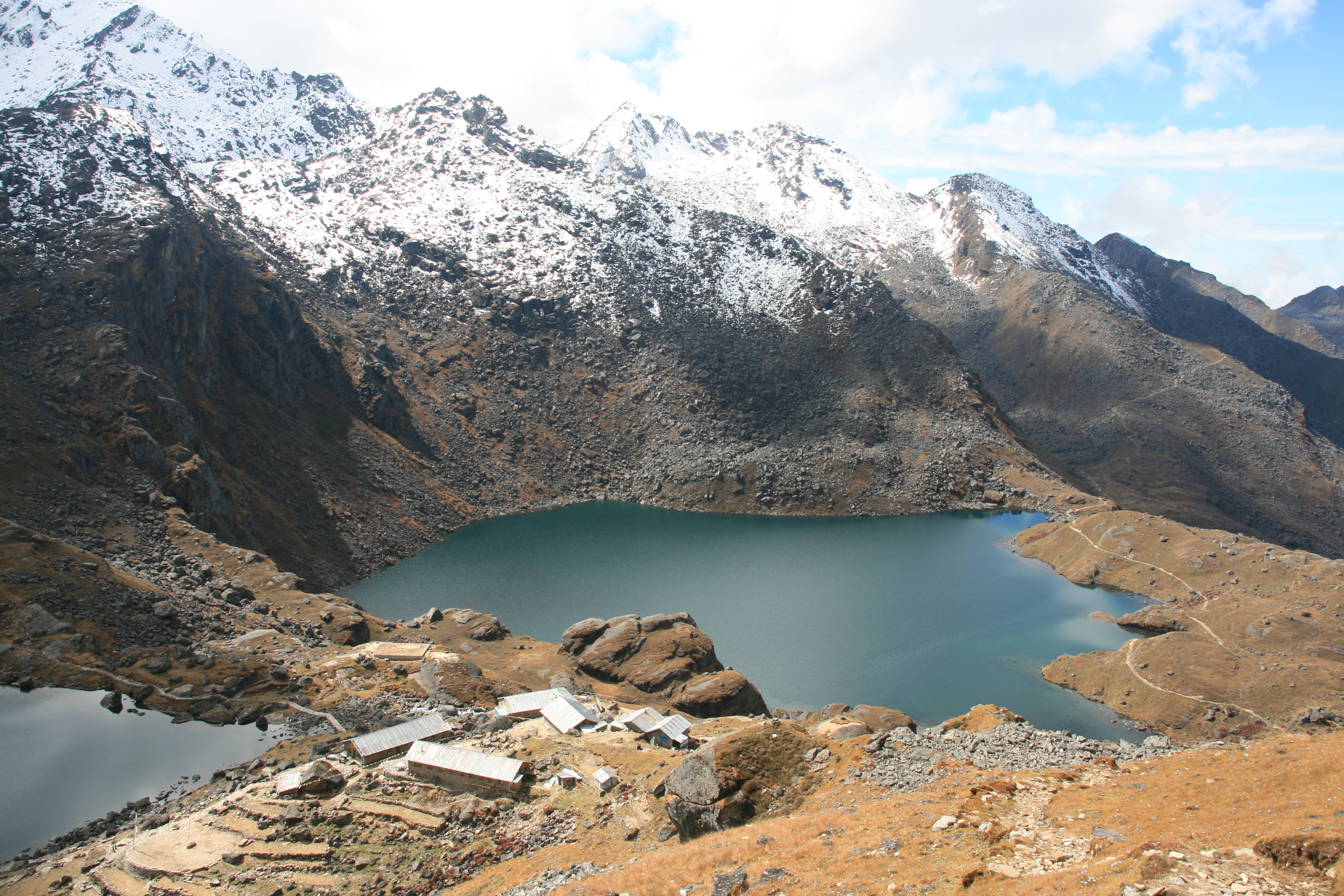
Gosainkunda Lake

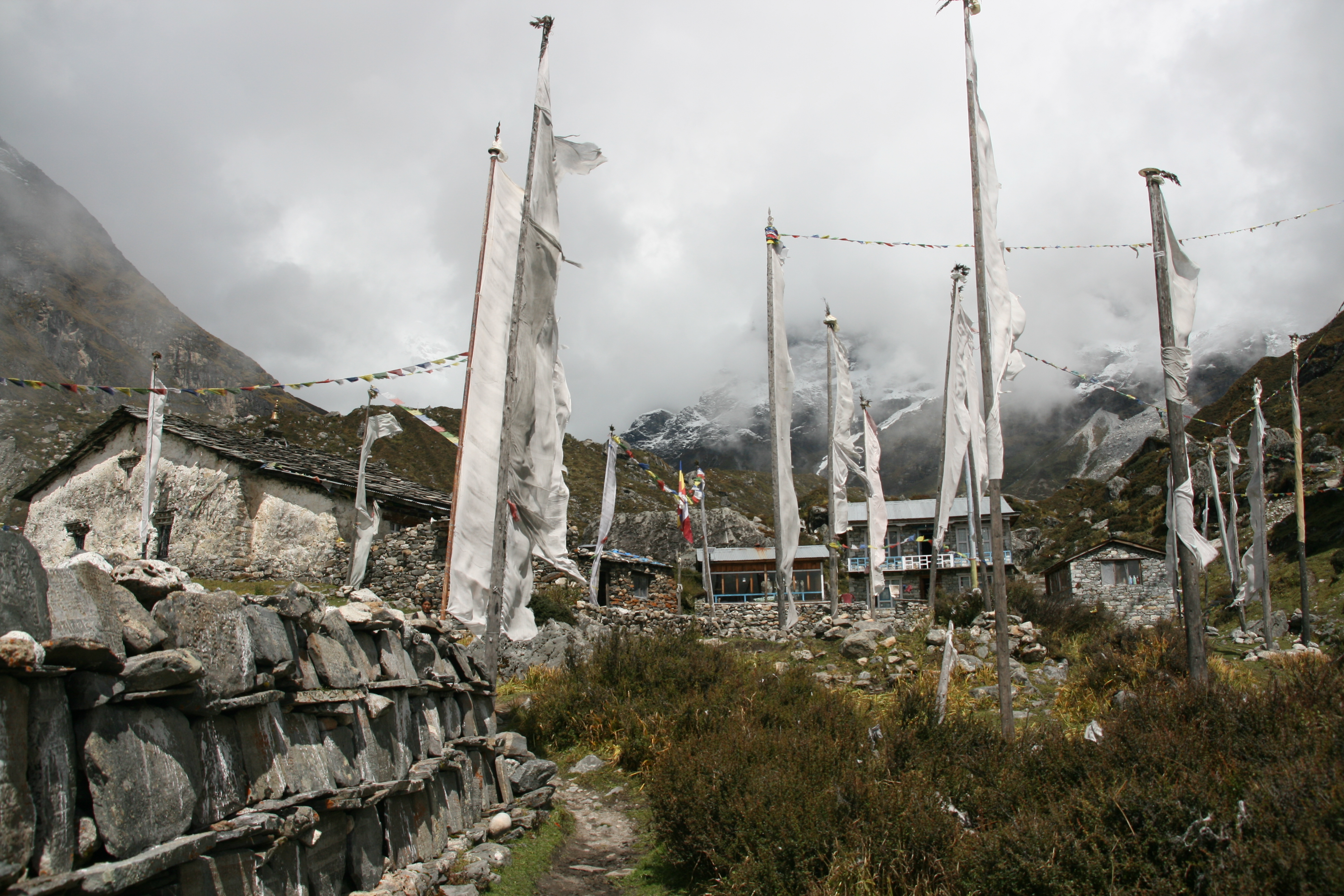
Kyanjin Gompa

Langtang Valley (Nepali: लाङटाङ उपत्यका) also known as Lamtang Valley is a Himalayan valley in the mountains of north-central Nepal, known for its trekking routes and natural environment.

== Administrative ==
The Langtang Valley lies in Rasuwa district of the Bagmati Province in Nepal. Situated about 80 kilometres north of the Kathmandu Valley, the valley lies within the Langtang National Park, which borders the Tibet Autonomous Region in Southwest China. Prior to the 2015 earthquake, 668 individuals were estimated to be living within the valley.

== Ecology ==
The Langtang Valley lies within the Langtang National Park. The park contains a wide variety of climatic zones, from subtropical to alpine. Approximately 25% of the park is forested. Trees include the deciduous oak and maple, evergreens like pine, and various types of rhododendron. Animal life includes the Himalayan black bear, Himalayan tahr, Red monkey, langur Assam macaque, snow leopard, yak, red panda and more than 250 species of birds.

== Culture ==
Among themselves, the local inhabitants of the Langtang valley refer to each other as 'Langtangpa'. They generally follow Tibetan Buddhism, and speak a Tibetan language that is closely related to the Tibetan spoken in Kyirong, southern Tibet. The Langtangpas regard the mountain Langtang Lirung as their 'yu-lha', their local country god. However, in the state census, the Langtangpas are categorised as Tamang. Langtang valley is believed to be the Beyul Dagam Namgo, one of the many hidden valleys blessed by Guru Padmasambhava.

== Economy ==
The traditional livelihoods of the Langtangpas have centered around agropastoralism. Since the mid-1970s, tourism has grown to become an important source of livelihoods in the Langtang Valley. Swiss cheese-making was introduced in Langtang in the 1950s by Werner Schulthess. Over time, Swiss cheese became a popular product of Langtang, and its production in the valley continues to this day.

== Access ==
The nearest motorable roadhead for the Langtang Valley is Syaphrubesi, which is also the base for most treks into the Langtang Valley. The distance of Syaphrubesi from Kathmandu is 113 km. But due to bad road conditions, it usually takes 6-8 hours to drive from Kathmandu to Syaphrubesi. Just as for the Langtang National Park, entering the Langtang Valley requires everyone except locals to have the TIMS permit and the Langtang National Park entry permit.

== Tourism ==
The Langtang Valley trek, from Syaphrubesi to Kyanjin Gompa and back, is the third most popular trek in Nepal, after the Annapurna Circuit and Everest Base Camp (EBC) treks. Several treks go through the Langtang valley and link it to nearby valleys, like the Helambu valley. In most of these treks, one can stay at local 'tea houses', which are run by locals in nearly every village in the valley, and where one gets basic lodging and food. Around 2000, with the support of the United Nations Development Programme, some of these were equipped with solar panels so that hikers could shower with warm water. There are also several mountain-climbing options available in the Langtang valley, ranging from relatively easy-to-climb peaks around 5,000 m high, such as Kyanjin Ri and Tsergo Ri, to technically challenging peaks, such as Dorje Lhakpa and Langtang Lirung.

== Permits ==
Foreign nationals trekking in the Langtang Valley are required to obtain a Langtang National Park Entry Permit before entering the protected area. Depending on the trekking regulations in force, a Trekkers' Information Management System (TIMS) card may also be required for some trekkers. The Langtang National Park Entry Permit is issued by the Department of National Parks and Wildlife Conservation and is available through the Nepal Tourism Board. As of 2026, the permit fee is NPR 3,000 for non-SAARC nationals and NPR 1,500 for citizens of SAARC member states. Permits may be obtained directly from the Nepal Tourism Board in Kathmandu or arranged through a registered trekking agency before the trek. Permit checks are carried out at the entrance to Langtang National Park near Syabrubesi and at several checkpoints along the trekking route, including Bamboo, Langtang Village, and Kyanjin Gompa.

== 2015 Nepal earthquake ==
The village of Langtang was almost completely destroyed (1 building survived) by a massive avalanche caused by the April 2015 Nepal earthquake. The village suffered an estimated 310 deaths, including 176 Langtang residents, 80 foreigners, and 10 army personnel. More than 100 bodies were never recovered. Several other villages in upper Langtang valley were also destroyed. The Langtangpas who survived the destruction of the earthquake were evacuated by helicopter to Kathmandu, where a displaced persons camp was temporarily set up at the Yellow Gumba near Swayanmbhu. Many Langtangpas returned to the valley in the following months, and a significant amount of reconstruction was completed within the first year after the earthquake. By early 2018, the centuries-old gompa at Kyanjin Gompa, which had also been destroyed in the earthquake, had been rebuilt. The Swiss-cheese factory at Kyanjin Gompa village was destroyed too, but has been rebuilt and since then become operational again.

== Climate change ==
Since the mid-2010s, Langtangpas have noticed that most natural springs in the valley have gone dry. Scientists have attributed the reduction in the glacier area of the Langtang glacier directly to anthropogenic climate change since the 1970s. The intergovernmental organisation ICIMOD conducts periodic cryospheric research in the Langtang valley and Yala Glacier.

== Langtang Himal ==
Tsergo Ri view point at Langtang Trekking Region

Langtang Himal is a mountain range in the Himalayas north of Langtang Valley which includes the following peaks:

Peak	elevation
Langtang Lirung	7,234 m (23,734 ft)
Langtang Ri	7,205 m (23,638 ft)
Tsogaka	7,193 m (23,599 ft)
Tsangbu Ri	6,781 m (22,247 ft)
Yansa Tsenji	6,690 m (21,950 ft)
Kyunga Ri	6,601 m (21,657 ft)
Ghenge Liru	6,581 m (21,591 ft)
Dogpache	6,562 m (21,529 ft)
Morimoto (Bhemdang Ri)	6,150 m (20,180 ft)
Yala Peak	5,520 m (18,110 ft)

== Jugal Himal ==
Jugal Himal is a mountain range in the Himalayas south-east of Langtang Valley which includes the following peaks:

Peak	elevation
Loenpo Gang	6,979 m (22,897 ft)
Dorje Lakpa	6,966 m (22,854 ft)
Langshisa Ri	6,427 m (21,086 ft)
Ganchenpo	6,387 m (20,955 ft)
Naya Kanga	5,863 m (19,236 ft)

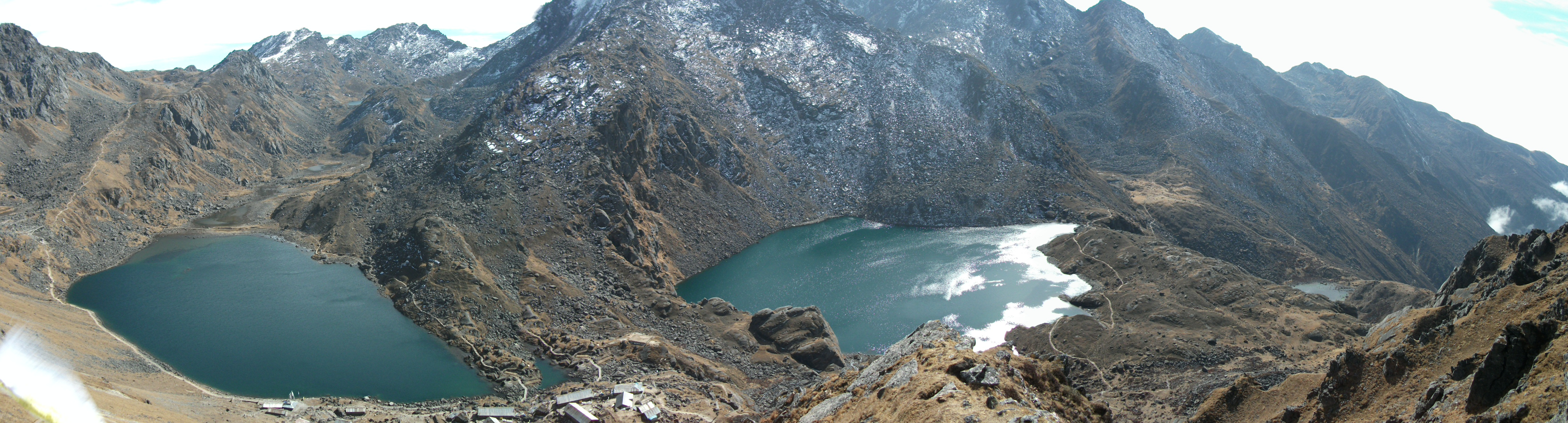
Panoramic view of Gosainkunda lake

== See also ==
- Langtang National Park
- The earthquake of April 25, 2015 in Nepal
- Path of the Mani
