= Langtang, Hunan =

Langtang Town 琅塘镇
- Town
- Location in Hunan
- Coordinates: 27°57′49″N 111°06′36″E
- Country: People's Republic of China
- Province: Hunan
- Prefecture-level city: Loudi
- County: Xinhua County

Area
  - Total: 127.7 km^{2} (49.3 sq mi)

Population
  - Total: 56,000
  - Density: 440/km^{2} (1,100/sq mi)
- Time zone: UTC+8 (China Standard)
- Postal code: 417607
- Area code: 0738

Langtang Town (simplified Chinese: 琅塘镇; traditional Chinese: 瑯塘鎮; pinyin: Lángtáng Zhèn) is an urban town in and subdivision of Xinhua County, Hunan Province, People's Republic of China.

== Administrative division ==
The town is divided into 50 villages and one community, which include the following areas: Huazhu Community, Tanjia Village, Liaoyuan Village, Wanping Village, Changle Village, Lexi Village, Lixi Village, Shimen Village, Daqiao Village, Qiaotou Village, Changxi Village, Gutang Village, Shuanglong Village, Panyang Village, Pengbo Village, Xinglong Village, Pingle Village, Shuangjiang Village, Bajiao Village, Shiban Village, Baiyun Village, Baishui Village, Zhongxin Village, Hujiawan Village, Wujia Village, Taipingpu Village, Zhexi Village, Qili Village, Luohong Village, Longtong Village, Tuanjieshan Village, Yinshuang Village, Bayou Village, Luanfengshan Village, Fenshui'ao Village, Aotian Village, Houzhai Village, Shimu Village, Zhangjia Village, Geshan Village, Guanghua Village, Suxi Village, Gaoping Village, Shizhen Village, Yangjiadian Village, Xintianqiao Village, Yangmuzhou Village, Dongxia Village, Xibian Village, Xianjin Village, and Meiluo Village (华竹社区、谭家村、辽远村、晚坪村、长乐村、乐溪村、礼溪村、石门村、大桥村、桥头村、长溪村、古塘村、双龙村、潘洋村、蓬勃村、兴隆村、平乐村、双江村、芭蕉村、石板村、白云村、白水溪村、中心村、胡家湾村、伍家村、太平铺村、柘溪村、七里村、罗洪村、龙通村、团结山村、印双村、芭尤村、鸾凤山村、分水坳村、坳田村、后寨村、石木村、张家村、隔山村、光华村、苏溪村、高坪村、石圳村、杨家殿村、新佃桥村、杨木洲村、洞下村、西边村、先进村、梅罗村)
