= Langtang National Park =

National Park of Nepal

- Nepali: लाङटाङ राष्ट्रिय निकुञ्ज
- IUCN category II (national park)
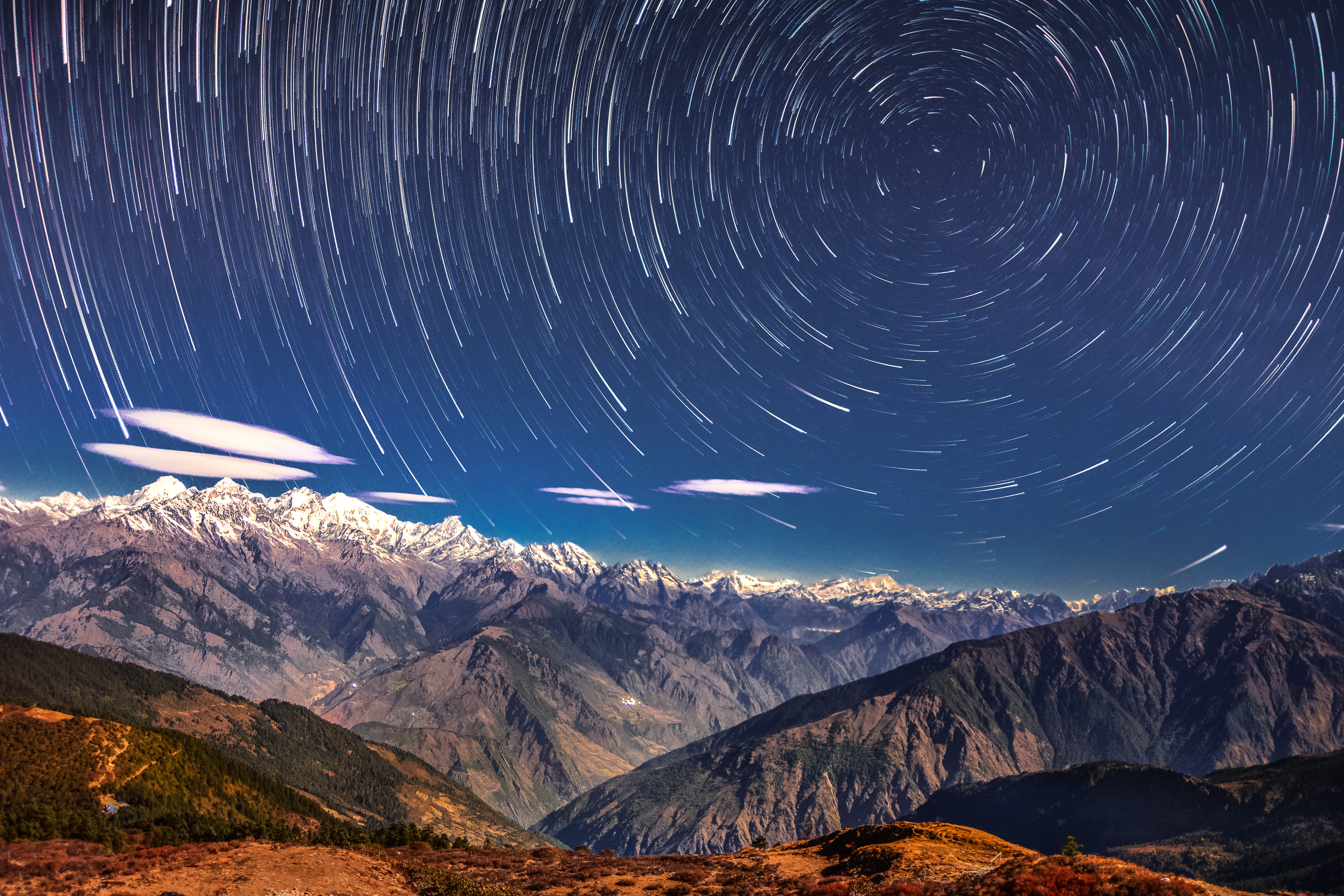
- Langtang National Park

- Location within Bagmati Province Location within Nepal Location within South Asia
- Location: Nepal
- Nearest city: Kathmandu
- Coordinates: 28°10′26″N 85°33′11″E
- Area: 1,710 km^{2} (660 sq mi)
- Established: 1976
- Governing body: Department of National Parks and Wildlife Conservation

Langtang National Park is a national park in north-central Nepal. It was established in 1976 as Nepal's first Himalayan national park and the country's fourth protected area. It covers an area of 1,710 km^{2} (660 sq mi) in the Nuwakot, Rasuwa and Sindhulpalchok Districts of the central Himalayan region. It contains 26 village communities and includes the Langtang valley. In the north and east it is linked with Qomolangma National Nature Preserve in the Tibet Autonomous Region. The eastern and western boundaries follow the Bhote Koshi and the Trishuli river, respectively.

The Gosainkunda lake is located at an elevation of 4,300 m (14,100 ft) inside the park. The Dorje Lakpa range at 6,988 m (22,927 ft) bisects the park from west–east to south–east. The summit of Langtang Lirung is the highest point in the park at 7,245 m (23,770 ft).

Langtang National Park is part of the Sacred Himalayan Landscape.

== History ==
In 1970, royal approval designated the establishment of Langtang National Park as the first protected area in the Himalayas. The national park was gazetted in 1976 and extended by a buffer zone of 420 km^{2} (160 sq mi) in 1998.

On 31 July 1992, Thai Airways International Flight 311 crashed into the park. The Airbus A310 was on approach to Tribhuvan International Airport in Kathmandu. All 113 people on board were killed.

In April 2015, the village of Langtang located within the park was destroyed by an avalanche of ice, rock and mud triggered by the April 2015 Nepal earthquake. At least 215 people were killed. In 2016, the International Astronomical Union named a 9.8km wide crater on Mars after the village, as a tribute.

A glacier collapse and ice-rock avalanche on the northern slope of Langtang Lirung mountain was thought to be the cause of the devastating 2026 Nepal floods on 26 August.

== Climate ==
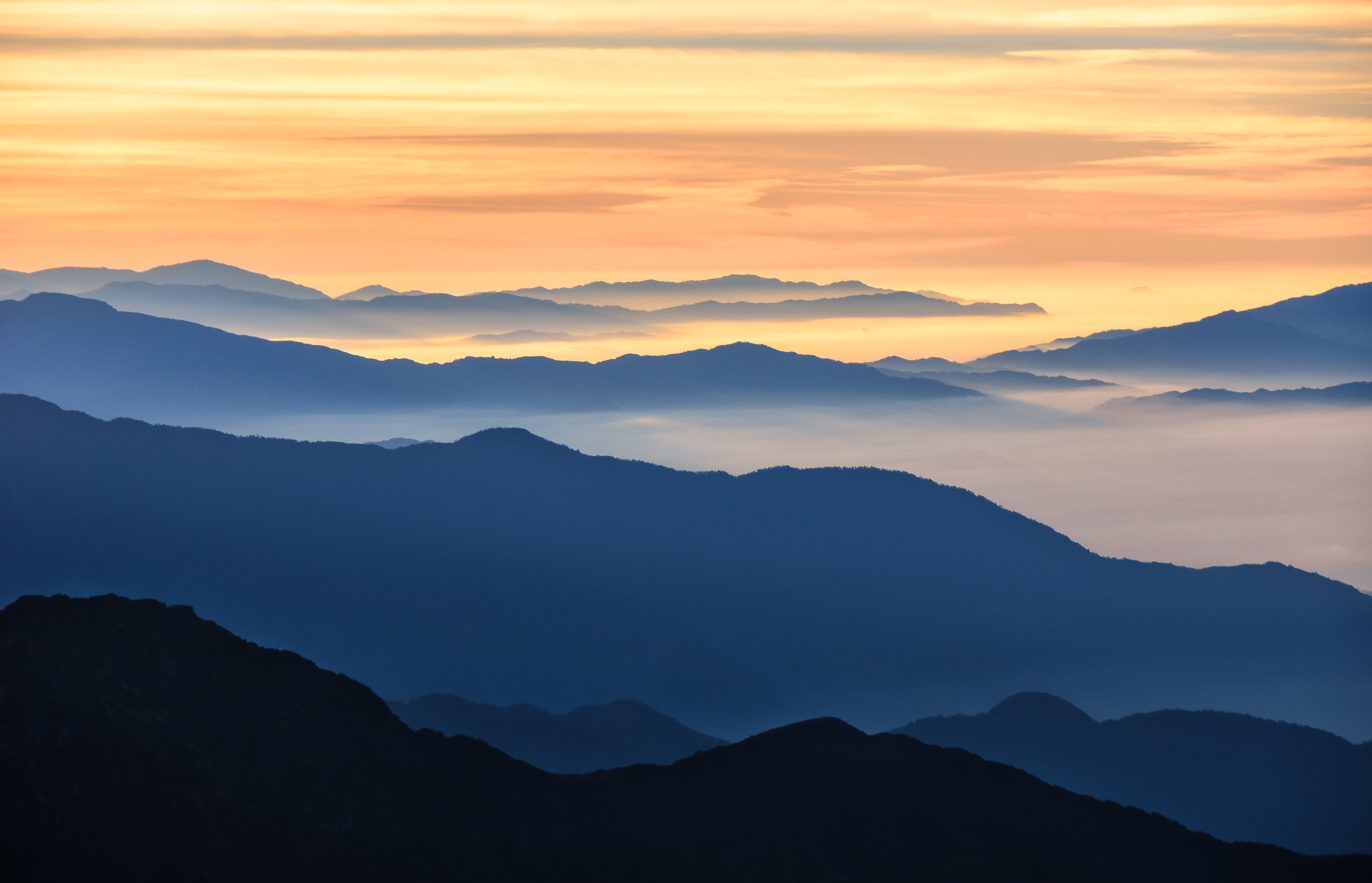
Sunrise in Langtang National Park

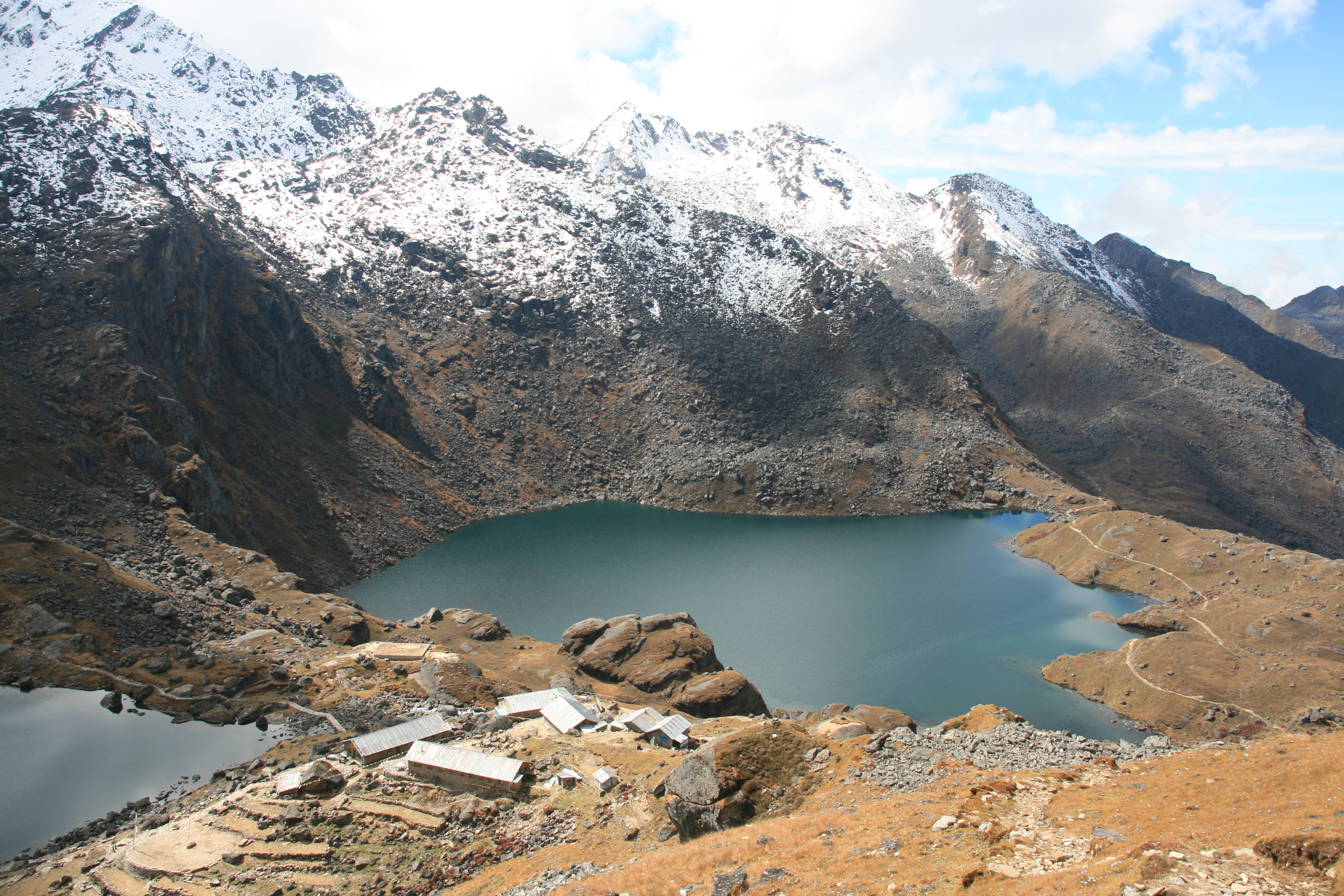
Gosainkunda Lake

The climate of the park is dominated by the southwest summer monsoon; most of the annual precipitation occurs from June to September, and temperatures vary greatly due to the extreme difference in elevation.

== Flora and fauna ==
Langtang National Park exhibits a high diversity of 14 vegetation types in 18 ecosystem types, ranging from upper tropical forests below 1,000 m (3,300 ft) m altitude to alpine scrub and perennial ice.
