= Gosaikunda Rural Municipality =

Rural Municipality in Bagmati Province, Nepal

Gosaikunda गोसाईंकुण्ड गाउँपालिका
- Rural Municipality
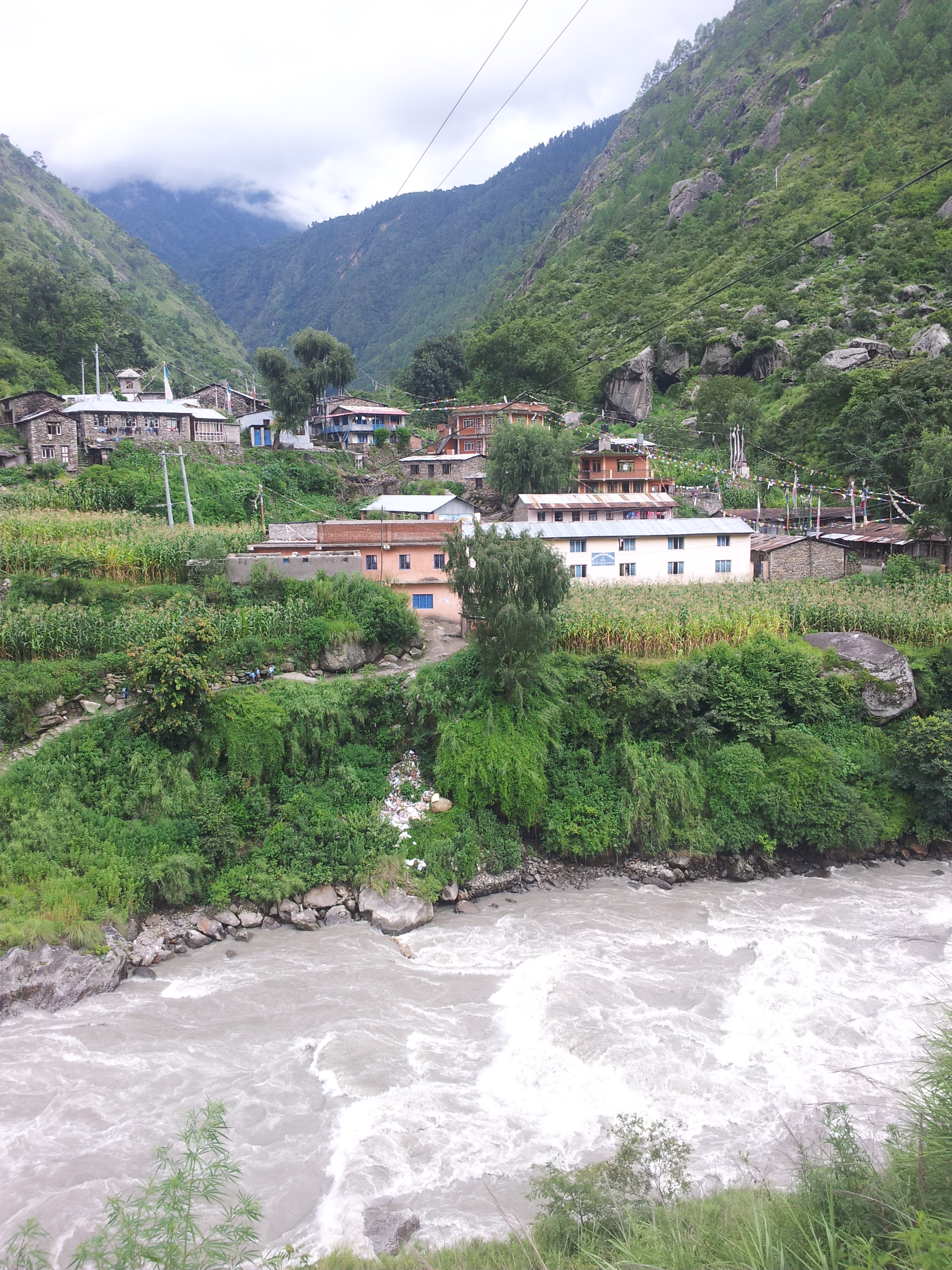
- A scene of Executive Office of Rural Municipality in Syaphru

- Location of Gosaikunda
- Coordinates: 28°9′48.68″N 85°20′10.77″E
- Country: Nepal
- Province: Bagmati Province
- District: Rasuwa
- Wards: 6
- Established: 10 March 2017

Government
  - Type: Rural Council
  - Chairperson: Mr. Kaisang Nurpu Tamang
  - Vice-chairperson: Mrs. Pratima Tamang
  - Executive Officer: Mr. Dutendra Chamling

Area
  - Total: 987.77 km^{2} (381.38 sq mi)

Population (2011)
  - Total: 7,143
  - Density: 7.231/km^{2} (18.73/sq mi)
- Time zone: UTC+5:45 (Nepal Standard Time)
- Postal Code: 45000
- Area code: 010
- Headquarter: Syaphru
- Website: Official Website

Gosaikunda (Nepali: गोसाईंकुण्ड) is a rural municipality located in Rasuwa District of Bagmati Province in Nepal. Rasuwa district is divided into five rural municipality and Gosaikunda is one of them. It is located near the border of Tibet-China on Himalayan range. It is surrounded by Sindhupalchok District in east, Naukunda Rural Municipality and Kalika Rural Municipality in south and Uttargaya Rural Municipality and Aamachhodingmo Rural Municipality in west. Tibet is located on the north side of the rural municipality. Total area of the rural municipality is 987.77 square kilometres (381.38 sq mi) and total population is 7,143 individuals.

== History ==
The rural municipality was formed on 10 March 2017, when Government of Nepal announced 753 local level units as per the new constitution of Nepal 2015 thus the rural municipality came into existence. The municipality was formed merging following former VDCs: Thuman, Timure, Briddhim, Langtang, Syaphru and Dhunche. The municipality is divided into 6 wards and the admin center of the rural municipality is located at Syaphru (ward no. 5).

The municipality was severely impacted by the 2026 Nepal floods. An estimated 1,000 local residents were reported missing and 5,000 residents reported requiring assistance. Land routes to Kathmandu were severed, causing shortages of staple foods, fuel, and medicine, and the local power grid went down. The rural municipality office and two ward offices were washed away in the flooding.

== Etymology ==
Gosaikunda rural municipality was named after Gosaikunda lake, which is situated in Langtang National Park. The area of the park is extended into 3 districts Nuwakot, Rasuwa and Sindhupalchok but the Gsaikunda lake falls under Rasuwa District.

== Point of interest ==
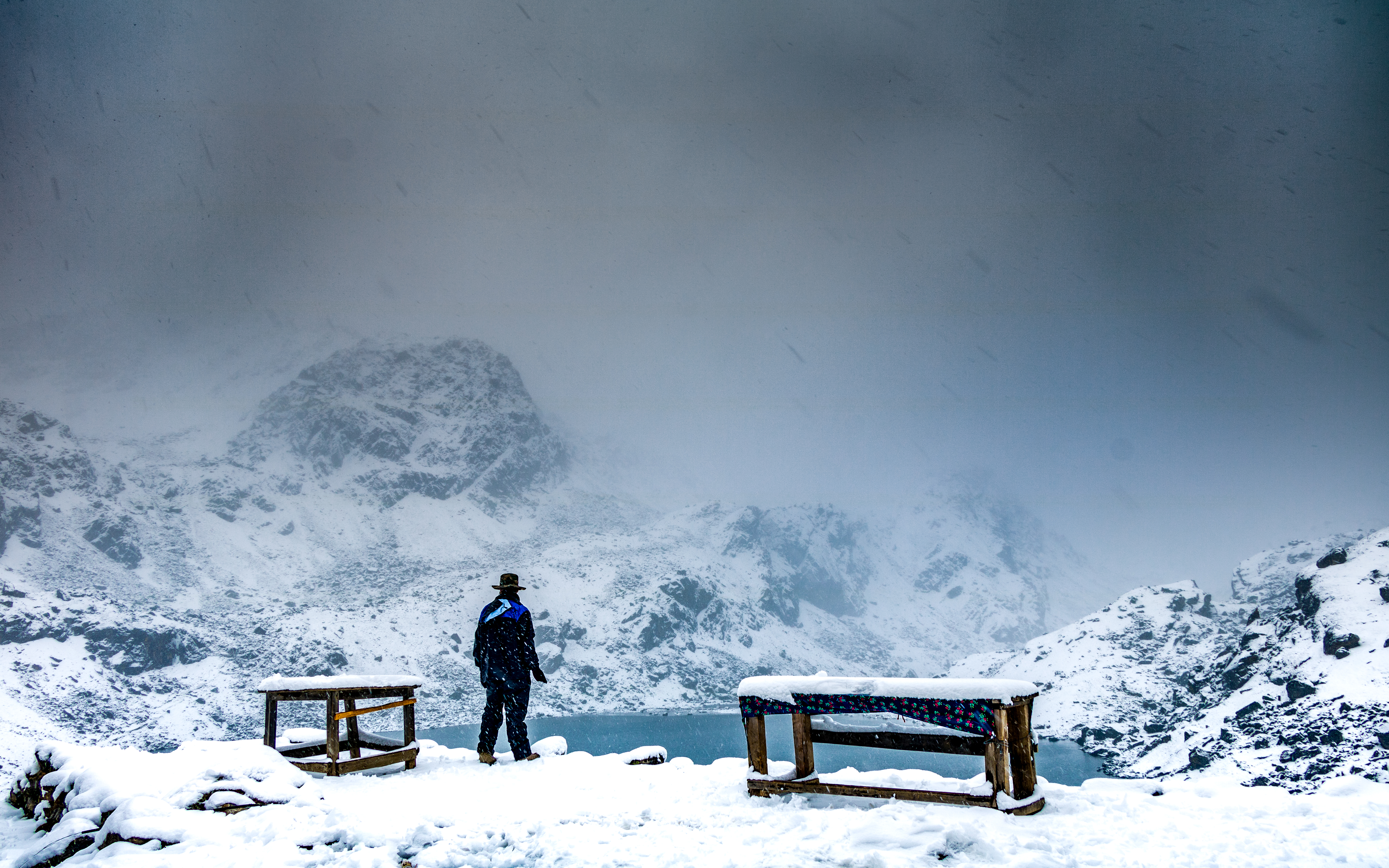
Snowfall at Gosaikunda

- Langtang National Park
- Gosaikunda Lake
- Rasuwagadhi
