= Haku =

Haku may refer to:

== People ==
- Haku (artist)
- Haku (surname)
- Haku (wrestler) (Tonga Fifita, born 1959), Tongan professional wrestler

== Characters ==
- Haku (Naruto), a character in Naruto media
- Haku, a character in the 2001 animated movie Spirited Away

== Places ==
- Haku, Iran
- Mount Haku, Japan
- Haku, Bagmati, Nepal
- Haku, Karnali, Nepal

== Adornment ==
- Lei (garland), garland worn on the head

== Animals ==
- Seriola lalandi, in the Māori language
