= Kalika Rural Municipality =

Rural Municipality in Bagmati, Nepal

Kalika (RM) कालिका गाउँपालिका
- Rural Municipality
- Location Kalika (RM) (Nepal)
- Coordinates: 27°59′46″N 85°12′14″E
- Country: Nepal
- Province: Bagmati
- District: Rasuwa District
- Wards: 5
- Established: 10 March 2017

Government
  - Type: Rural Council
  - Chairperson: Mr.Hari Krishna Devkota
  - Vice-chairperson: Mrs. Mira Lama
  - Term of office: (2022 - 2026)

Area
  - Total: 192.54 km^{2} (74.34 sq mi)

Population (2011)
  - Total: 9,421
  - Density: 48.93/km^{2} (126.7/sq mi)
- Time zone: UTC+5:45 (Nepal Standard Time)
- Headquarter: Dhaibung
- Website: kalikamunrasuwa.gov.np

Kalika is a rural municipality located within the Rasuwa District of the Bagmati Province of Nepal. The municipality spans 192.54 square kilometres (74.34 sq mi) of area, with a total population of 9,421 according to a 2011 Nepal census.

== History ==
On March 10, 2017, the Government of Nepal restructured the local level bodies into 753 new local level structures. The previous Ramche, small portion of Laharepauwa, Dhaibung and half portion of Bhorle VDCs were merged to form Kalika Rural Municipality. Kalika is divided into 5 wards, with Dhaibung declared the administrative center of the rural municipality.

The municipality was severely impacted by the 2026 Nepal floods, with ward 1 reported as "completely overwhelmed by floodwaters" and 300 people displaced.
