= Aamachhodingmo Rural Municipality =

Aamachhodingmo (RM) आमाछोदिङमो गाउँपालिका
- Rural Municipality
- Location Aamachhodingmo (RM) (Nepal)
- Coordinates: 28°10′16″N 85°18′53″E
- Country: Nepal
- Province: Bagmati
- District: Rasuwa District
- Wards: 5
- Established: 10 March 2017

Government
  - Type: Rural Council
  - Chairperson: Mr. Buchung Tamang
  - Vice-chairperson: Mrs. Chandika Tamang
  - Term of office: (2022 - 2026)

Area
  - Total: 682.23 km^{2} (263.41 sq mi)

Population (2011)
  - Total: 5,490
  - Density: 8.05/km^{2} (20.8/sq mi)
- Time zone: UTC+5:45 (Nepal Standard Time)
- Headquarter: Goljung
- Website: aamachhodingmomun.gov.np

Aamachhodingmo is a Rural municipality located within the Rasuwa District of the Bagmati Province of Nepal. The municipality spans 682.23 square kilometres (263.41 sq mi) of area, with a total population of 5,490 according to a 2011 Nepal census.

== History ==
On March 10, 2017, the Government of Nepal restructured the local level bodies into 753 new local level structures. The previous Gatlang, Chilime, Goljung and portion of Haku VDCs were merged to form Aamachhodingmo Rural Municipality. Aamachhodingmo is divided into 5 wards, with Goljung declared the administrative center of the rural municipality.

The municipality was severely impacted by the 2026 Nepal floods, with road access "entirely cut off", causing shortages of staple foods, fuel, and medicine.
