= Uttargaya Rural Municipality =

Uttargaya (RM) उत्तरगया गाउँपालिका
- Rural Municipality
- Location Uttargaya (RM) (Nepal)
- Coordinates: 27°59′31″N 85°10′58″E
- Country: Nepal
- Province: Bagmati
- District: Rasuwa District
- Wards: 5
- Established: 10 March 2017

Government
  - Type: Rural Council
  - Chairperson: Mr. Upendra Lamsal
  - Vice-chairperson: Mrs. Chameli Gurung
  - Term of office: (2017–2022)

Area
  - Total: 104.51 km^{2} (40.35 sq mi)

Population (2011)
  - Total: 8,255
  - Density: 78.99/km^{2} (204.6/sq mi)
- Time zone: UTC+5:45 (Nepal Standard Time)
- Headquarter: Laharepauwa
- Website: uttargayamun.gov.np

Uttargaya is a Rural municipality located within the Rasuwa District of the Bagmati Province of Nepal. The municipality spans 104.51 square kilometres (40.35 sq mi) of area, with a total population of 8,255 according to a 2011 Nepal census.

== History ==
On 10 March 2017, the Government of Nepal restructured the local level bodies into 753 new local level structures. The previous Thulogaun, Dandagaun and portion of Haku and Laharepauwa VDCs were merged to form Uttargaya Rural Municipality. Uttargaya is divided into 5 wards, with Laharepauwa declared the administrative center of the rural municipality.

The municipality was severely impacted by the 2026 Nepal floods. An estimated half of the municipality's population was impacted, with 600 local residents reported missing. The Betrawati Bazaar in the municipality was completely destroyed by the flash floods. Power lines were downed, cutting off electricity access, and multiple bridges were washed away, causing shortages of staple foods, fuel, and medicine. The rural municipality office and two ward offices were washed away by the flooding.
