= Rasuwa 1 =

Parliamentary constituency in Nepal

- Parliamentary constituency
- Rasuwa 1 in Bagmati Province
- Province: Bagmati Province
- District: Rasuwa District

Current constituency
- Created: 1991
- Party: Nepali Congress
- Member of Parliament: Mohan Acharya

Rasuwa 1 is the parliamentary constituency of Rasuwa District in Nepal. This constituency came into existence on the Constituency Delimitation Commission (CDC) report submitted on 31 August 2017.

== Incorporated areas ==
Rasuwa 1 incorporates the entirety of Rasuwa District.

== Assembly segments ==
It encompasses the following Bagmati Province Provincial Assembly segment

- Rasuwa 1(A)
- Rasuwa 1(B)

== Members of Parliament ==
=== Parliament/Constituent Assembly ===
| Election | Member | Party |
|---|---|---|
| 1991 | Ram Krishna Upadhyaya | Rastriya Prajatantra Party (Chand) |
| 1992 | Ram Krishna Upadhyaya | Rastriya Prajatantra Party |
| 1997 | Ram Krishna Upadhyaya | Rastriya Prajatantra Party (Chand) |
| 1999 | Dil Bahadur Lama | Nepali Congress |
| 2008 | Prem Bahadur Tamang | CPN (Maoist) |
| January 2009 | Prem Bahadur Tamang | UCPN (Maoist) |
| 2013 | Janardhan Dhakal | CPN (Unified Marxist–Leninist) |
| 2017 | Mohan Acharya | Nepali Congress |

=== Provincial Assembly ===
==== 1(A) ====
| Election | Member | Party |
|---|---|---|
| 2017 | Prabhat Tamang | Nepali Congress |

==== 1(B) ====
| Election | Member | Party |
|---|---|---|
| 2017 | Prem Bahadur Tamang | Naya Shakti Party, Nepal |
| May 2019 | Prem Bahadur Tamang | Samajbadi Party, Nepal |
| April 2020 | Prem Bahadur Tamang | People's Socialist Party, Nepal |

== Election results ==
=== Election in the 2020s ===
==== 2022 general election ====
| Candidate | Party | Votes | % |
|---|---|---|---|
| Mohan Acharya | Nepali Congress | 18,235 | 66.49 |
| Tsowang Tenzin Tamang | CPN (UML) | 8,614 | 31.41 |
| Others | | 578 | 2.11 |
| Total | | 27,427 | 100.00 |
| Majority | | 9,621 | |
| Nepali Congress hold | | | |

=== Election in the 2010s ===
==== 2017 legislative elections ====
| Party | Candidate | Votes |
|---|---|---|
| Nepali Congress | Mohan Acharya | 14,453 |
| CPN (Unified Marxist–Leninist) | Jarnardhan Dhakal | 10,278 |
| Others | | 211 |
| Result | Congress gain | |
Source: Election Commission

==== 2017 Nepalese provincial elections ====
===== 1(A) =====
| Party | Candidate | Votes |
|---|---|---|
| Nepali Congress | Prabhat Tamang | 6,976 |
| CPN (Unified Marxist–Leninist) | Kanaryal Tamang | 5,152 |
| Others | | 236 |
| Result | Congress gain | |
Source: Election Commission

===== 1(B) =====
| Party | Candidate | Votes |
|---|---|---|
| Naya Shakti Party, Nepal | Prem Bahadur Tamang | 7,040 |
| CPN (Maoist Centre) | Indra Prasad Gotamae | 5,692 |
| Others | | 116 |
| Result | Naya Shakti gain | |
Source: Election Commission

==== 2013 Constituent Assembly election ====
| Party | Candidate | Votes |
|---|---|---|
| CPN (Unified Marxist–Leninist) | Janardhan Dhakal | 6,628 |
| UCPN (Maoist) | Prem Bahadur Tamang | 6,192 |
| Nepali Congress | Lama Karpu Tamang | 4,948 |
| Others | | 864 |
| Result | CPN (UML) gain | |
Source: NepalNews

=== Election in the 2000s ===
==== 2008 Constituent Assembly election ====
| Party | Candidate | Votes |
|---|---|---|
| CPN (Maoist) | Prem Bahadur Tamang | 11,147 |
| CPN (Unified Marxist–Leninist) | Madhav Prasad Aryal | 4,604 |
| Nepali Congress | Bal Chandra Paudel | 3,612 |
| Others | | 1,163 |
| Result | Maoist gain | |
Source: Election Commission

=== Election in the 1990s ===
==== 1999 legislative elections ====
| Party | Candidate | Votes |
|---|---|---|
| Nepali Congress | Dil Bahadur Lama | 6,424 |
| CPN (Unified Marxist–Leninist) | Subba Lama | 6,357 |
| Rastriya Prajatantra Party (Chand) | Ram Krishna Acharya | 2,880 |
| Others | | 1,933 |
| Invalid Votes | | 1,454 |
| Result | Congress gain | |
Source: Election Commission

==== 1994 legislative elections ====
| Party | Candidate | Votes |
|---|---|---|
| Rastriya Prajatantra Party | Ram Krishna Acharya | 9,175 |
| Nepali Congress | Bal Chandra Paudel | 7,232 |
| Result | RPP hold | |
Source: Election Commission

==== 1991 legislative elections ====
| Party | Candidate | Votes |
|---|---|---|
| Rastriya Prajatantra Party (Chand) | Ram Krishna Acharya | 7,292 |
| CPN (Unified Marxist–Leninist) | Nurbu Chirring Tamang | 4,717 |
| Result | RPP (C) gain | |

== See also ==
- List of parliamentary constituencies of Nepal
