= Haku, Nepal =

Haku, Nepal may refer to:

- Haku, Bagmati
- Haku, Karnali
