= Dandagaun =

Dandagaun may refer to the following places in Nepal:

- Dandagaun, Bagmati
- Dandagaun, Jajarkot
- Dandagaun, Kosi
- Dandagaun, Rapti
- Dandagaun, Rasuwa
- Dandagaun, Sagarmatha
