= Bal Chandra =

Bal Chandra may refer to:

- Bal Chandra Poudel (born 1961), Nepalese politician
- Bal Chandra Misra, Indian politician
