= Timure =

Town in Bagmati Province, Nepal

- Village development committee
- Location in Nepal
- Coordinates: 28.253742°N 85.366481°E
- Country: Nepal
- Ward No.: 2
- Rural municipality: Gosaikunda
- District: Rasuwa
- Province: Province No. 3

Population (1991)
  - Total: 562
- Time zone: UTC+5:45 (Nepal Time)

Timure (Nepali: टिमुरे) is a small town and headquarters of ward no. 2 of Gosaikunda Rural Municipality. It is about 19 km north from Syaphru (headquarters of Gosaikunda rural municipality).

Timure was previously a village development committee in Rasuwa District in the Bagmati Zone of northern Nepal. At the time of the 1991 Nepal census it had a population of 562 people living in 141 individual households. Reconstructions of local level units in Nepal on 10 March 2017 made it a part of new Gosaikunda Rural Municipality.

In December 2014, a port of entry between China and Nepal was opened near Rasuwa Fort a few kilometers north of the village. The town was heavily damaged by the 2026 Nepal–Tibet floods. Over 250 buildings were destroyed, with only six homes in the town left standing.

== Climate ==
Climate data for Timure, elevation 1,900 m (6,200 ft)
Month	Jan	Feb	Mar	Apr	May	Jun	Jul	Aug	Sep	Oct	Nov	Dec	Year
Mean daily maximum °C (°F)	13.8 (56.8)	15.8 (60.4)	19.6 (67.3)	25.0 (77.0)	26.4 (79.5)	26.4 (79.5)	24.4 (75.9)	24.2 (75.6)	23.7 (74.7)	22.5 (72.5)	17.8 (64.0)	14.8 (58.6)	21.2 (70.2)
Mean daily minimum °C (°F)	3.6 (38.5)	4.5 (40.1)	8.5 (47.3)	10.3 (50.5)	12.5 (54.5)	15.7 (60.3)	16.3 (61.3)	16.1 (61.0)	14.7 (58.5)	11.0 (51.8)	6.8 (44.2)	4.1 (39.4)	10.3 (50.6)
Average precipitation mm (inches)	22.3 (0.88)	23.8 (0.94)	50.3 (1.98)	33.8 (1.33)	40.8 (1.61)	105.1 (4.14)	237.1 (9.33)	231.2 (9.10)	138.6 (5.46)	41.8 (1.65)	6.9 (0.27)	11.3 (0.44)	943 (37.13)
Source 1: Australian National University
Source 2: Japan International Cooperation Agency (precipitation)

== See also ==
- Rasuwa Fort
