= List of districts of Bagmati Province =

Districts of Bagmati बागमतीका जिल्लाहरु (Nepali)
- Category: Jilla
- Location: Nepal
- Created: pre 1816
- Number: 13 (as of 20 September 2015)
- Populations: 1,744,240 – 43,300
- Areas: 2,542 square kilometres (981 mi^{2}) - 119 square kilometres (46 sq mi)
- Government: District Coordination Committee
- Subdivisions: Urban Municipality; Rural Municipality

Bagmati Province is divided into 13 districts. A district is administrated by the head of the District Coordination Committee and the District Administration Officer. The districts are further divided to municipalities or rural municipalities.

== District official include ==
- Chief District Officer, an official under Ministry of Home Affairs is appointed by the government as the highest administrative officer in a district. The C.D.O is responsible for proper inspection of all the departments in a district such as health, education, security and all other government offices.
- District Coordination Committee acts as an executive to the District Assembly. The DCC coordinates with the Provincial Assembly to establish coordination between the Provincial Assembly and rural municipalities and municipalities and to settle disputes, if any, of political nature. It also maintains coordination between the provincial and Federal government and the local bodies in the district.
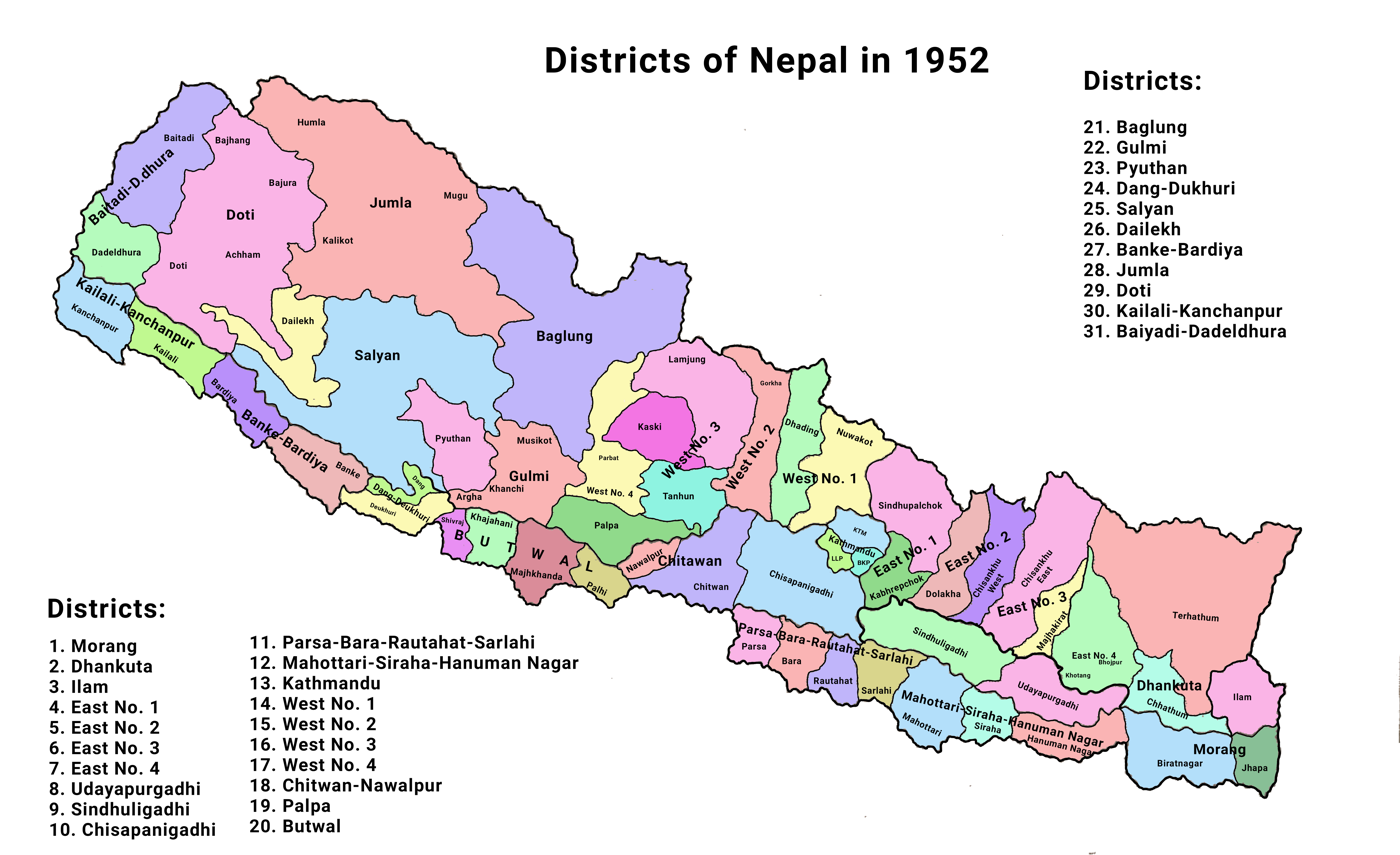
  Districts of Nepal in 1952

Districts of Bagmati
| Districts | Nepali | Headquarters | Area (km^{2}.) | Population (2011) | Official Website |
|---|---|---|---|---|---|
| Sindhuli District | सिन्धुली जिल्ला | Sindhulimadhi | 2,491 | 296,192 | |
| Ramechhap District | रामेछाप जिल्ला | Manthali | 1,546 | 202,646 | |
| Dolakha District | दोलखा जिल्ला | Charikot | 2,191 | 186,557 | |
| Bhaktapur District | भक्तपुर जिल्ला | Bhaktapur | 119 | 304,651 | |
| Dhading District | धादिङ जिल्ला | Dhading Besi | 1,926 | 336,067 | |
| Kathmandu District | काठमाडौँ जिल्ला | Kathmandu | 395 | 1,744,240 | |
| Kavrepalanchok District | काभ्रेपलान्चोक जिल्ला | Dhulikhel | 1,396 | 381,937 | |
| Lalitpur District | ललितपुर जिल्ला | Lalitpur | 385 | 468,132 | |
| Nuwakot District | नुवाकोट जिल्ला | Bidur | 1,121 | 277,471 | |
| Rasuwa District | रसुवा जिल्ला | Dhunche | 1,544 | 43,300 | |
| Sindhupalchok District | सिन्धुपाल्चोक जिल्ला | Chautara | 2,542 | 287,798 | |
| Chitwan District | चितवन जिल्ला | Bharatpur | 2,218 | 579,984 | |
| Makwanpur District | मकवानपुर जिल्ला | Hetauda | 2,426 | 420,477 | |
| Bagmati Province | बागमती प्रदेश | Hetauda | 20,300 km^{2} | 5,529,452 | |

== See also ==
- List of Provinces of Nepal
- List of Districts of Nepal
