= Bhorle =

Bhorle may refer to:

- Bhorle, Bagmati, Nepal
- Bhorle, Dhawalagiri, Nepal
