= Mohan Acharya =

Nepali politician and businessman

Honourable Mohan Acharya MP
- मोहन आचार्य

Member of Parliament, Pratinidhi Sabha
- Incumbent
- Assumed office 4 March 2018
- Preceded by: Janardhan Dhakal
- Constituency: Rasuwa 1

Personal details
- Born: 11 April 1977 (age 49)
- Party: Nepali Congress

Mohan Acharya is a Nepali businessman, politician and member of the House of Representatives of the federal parliament. He was elected under the first-past-the-post system to represent the Rasuwa-1 constituency as the Nepali Congress representative. He defeated his nearest rival Janardan Dhakal by more than 4,000 votes. He is also a member of the House Public Accounts Committee.
