= Sherpagaun =

Coordinates: 28°10′N 85°24′E

- Village
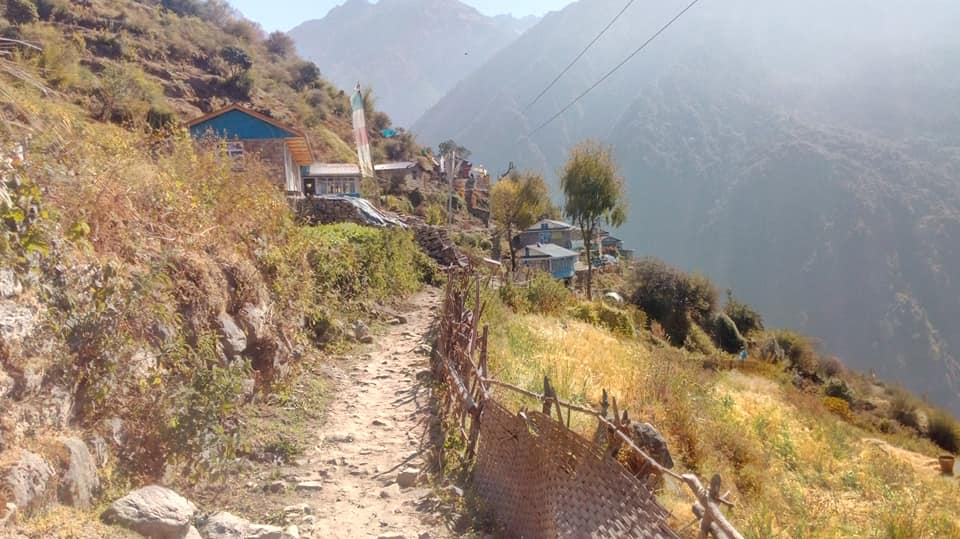
- Interactive map of Sherpagaun
- Country: Nepal
- Zone: Bagmati Zone
- District: Rasuwa District
- VDC: Briddhim
- Time zone: UTC+5:45 (Nepal Time)

Sherpagaun (village, Nepalese) is a small hamlet from Briddhim Village development committee located in Langtang National Park in the northern part of Nepal, near Tibet and the Himalayas, about 2500 meters above sea level. The local economy is primarily agricultural farming of such staple foods as potatoes, corn, wheat, barley, and cattle farming of cows, goats, sheep, mules, and yak. The Langtang region is very popular in the tourism business. Sherpagaun is on one of the tourist routes to Langtang region, and some people in this area have opened small motels to get extra income.

There is one government funded school in the village which provides education until grade 5, but not enough students attend to allow the school to function properly. Some children have relocated to Kathmandu to become Buddhist monks, while others have sought schooling overseas in hopes of a better life and education.

Most residents of the community are Buddhist; many of their ancestors were migrants from Tibet. As tourists have started to take the route of Sherpagaun to avoid the crowd of Lama Hotel, the villagers have started to build new tea houses and homestays. Due to the newly built infrastructure and better views of the hiking trail, the path via Sherpagaun is becoming popular among trekkers to Langtang.
