= Yarsa =

Yarsa Village Development Committee यार्सा गाउँ बिकास समिति
- Former Village development committee
- Yarsa Village Development Committee
- Location in Nepal
- Coordinates: 28°0′N 85°19′E
- Country: Nepal
- Zone: Bagmati Zone
- District: Rasuwa District
- Rural Municipality: Rural Municipality

Population (1991)
  - Total: 3,414
- Time zone: UTC+5:45 (Nepal Time)
- Postal Code: 45009
- Website: https://naukundamun.gov.np

Yarsa was a Village Development Committee, which was dissolved on 10 March 2017 and merged into Naukunda Rural Municipality. Previously, the Panchayat was dissolved and turned into the VDC by the Constitution of Nepal 1990.

Yarsa was located in Rasuwa District in the Bagmati Zone of northern Nepal. The former wards (5 – 9) of the VDC have been merged into ward number 1 and the former wards (1 – 4) of the VDC has been merged into ward number 2 of Naukunda Rural Municipality.
