= Naukunda Rural Municipality =

Naukunda (RM) नौकुण्ड गाउँपालिका
- Rural Municipality
- Location Naukunda (RM) (Nepal)
- Coordinates: 28°01′22″N 85°16′06″E
- Country: Nepal
- Province: Bagmati
- District: Rasuwa District
- Wards: 6
- Established: 10 March 2017

Government
  - Type: Rural Council
  - Chairperson: Mr. Nurbu Syangbo Ghale
  - Vice-chairperson: Mr. Chandra Bahadur Galan
  - Term of office: (2017 - 2022)

Area
  - Total: 126.99 km^{2} (49.03 sq mi)

Population (2011)
  - Total: 11,824
  - Density: 93.110/km^{2} (241.15/sq mi)
- Time zone: UTC+5:45 (Nepal Standard Time)
- Headquarter: Saramthali
- Website: naukundamun.gov.np

Naukunda is a Rural municipality located within the Rasuwa District of the Bagmati Province of Nepal. The municipality spans 126.99 square kilometres (49.03 sq mi) of area, with a total population of 11,824 according to a 2011 Nepal census.

On March 10, 2017, the Government of Nepal restructured the local level bodies into 753 new local level structures. The previous Yarsa, Saramthali and half portion of Bhorle VDCs were merged to form Naukunda Rural Municipality. Naukunda is divided into 6 wards, with Saramthali declared the administrative center of the rural municipality.
