= Bal Chandra Poudel =

Nepalese politician

- बालचन्द्र पौडेल

Personal details
- Born: 22 June 1959 (age 66) Laharepauwa, Rasuwa, Kingdom of Nepal
- Party: Nepali Congress
- Known for: 1979 Nepalese student protests People's Movement 1990; People's Movement 2006

Bal Chandra Poudel (Nepali: बालचन्द्र पौडेल; born 8 Asaar 2016 B.S.) is a Nepali Politician from the Nepali Congress party. He was Party President for the district of Rasuwa for several decades.

Poudel spent most of his youth in prison fighting against the Panchayat regime. He contested several parliamentary elections representing Nepali Congress but lost it all times: one in 1991, against popular leader Ram Krishna Acharya; a founding member of Rastriya Prajatantra Party.

== Political career ==
Poudel entered politics in 1974 inspired by the social-democratic ideals of Nepali Congress. His political career is believed to be very honest and ideal. Poudel is well known for his keen participation in anti-panchayat movements in Nepal. It is believed in the district of Rasuwa that Poudel was the only one to actively involve in anti-panchayat movements and movements of civil rights in Nepal until multi party democracy was introduced. He actively participated in the People's Movement I (Jana Aandalon) of 1990, which led to the end of the Panchayat system and the removal of the ban on political parties. Poudel stood as a candidate for the Parliament of Nepal from Rasuwa in 2051 B.S. He lost the election by few hundred votes which went on very hard to Nepali Congress in the Parliament of Nepal, as it was left out few seats behind by Communist Party of Nepal (Unified Marxist-Leninist) to become the largest party of Nepal.

Poudel was the president of the Nepali Congress party for the district of Rasuwa for decades before multi party democracy was introduced in Nepal. He actively held the responsibility as district president of Rasuwa from 2004 to 2008.

In 2006, Poudel was arrested for organizing a protest rally in Kathmandu and chanting slogans like "ज्ञानेन्द्र चोर देश छोड", which literally means: Burglar King leave my country. During the period of direct rule by King Gyanendra, he was arrested along with other party members during a protest rally on 18 February 2005.

=== Constituent Assembly election, 2008 ===
Poudel was a candidate in the Constituent Assembly election of 2008 (2064 B.S.) On 1 April 2008, during the election period in Rasuwa, he and other Nepali Congress members were attacked by Maoists in Rasuwa. The NC had announced the event as "indefinite shutdown in Rasuwa district protesting the Maoists' attack on NC candidate Bal Chandra Poudel and its cadres on Tuesday, April 01, 2008.". He was taken to the Teaching Hospital by air. A total 25 people were arrested from Maoists after the incident.

== Controversial Claims ==
On 15 August 2020, in a television interview with popular journalist Rishi Dhamala, Poudel claimed that "Our current party president is the most ineffective and unsuccessful president throughout the history". Furthermore, he lashed out at president Deuba citing Deuba's ineffectiveness as a leader of the opposition in the Federal Parliament of Nepal.

In the same interview, Poudel even criticized other leaders like Ram Chandra Paudel by stating that "We are being unfair by coercing our leaders to carry load of the party".

== See also ==
- Nepali Congress
- Girija Prasad Koirala
- 2006 democracy movement in Nepal
- People's Movement I (1990)
