= Haku (artist) =

Taiwanese indigenous wood sculptor

- 陳文生
- Born: Haku (哈古); 1943 (age 82–83); Taitō Prefecture, Japanese Taiwan
- Occupations: farmer, sculptor, chief of the Kasavakan community

Haku (born 1943), whose Chinese name is Chen Wen-sheng (Chinese: 陳文生), is a Taiwanese Puyuma artist and chief of the Kasavakan community in Taitung. He is a wood sculptor and icon of Taiwanese Indigenous artists.

== Life ==
Haku was born to the son of a chief in Kasavakan (an Indigenous community) in Taitung City and the daughter of a chief in the nearby Mavaliew Indigenous community. Since an earlier child of his parents died at a young age, Chief Taukia (Haku’s paternal grandfather) chose the name “Haku” for him in an effort to ensure a better fortune. In the Puyuma language, “haku” means “wooden coffin.”

Haku went to the Taitung Agricultural Extension School for middle school and vocational school. After graduating and completing his mandatory military service, he began farming in his community. After his father died in 1978, he became the ayawan (chief) of the community.

In 1984, he visited and was deeply moved by the exhibition Taitung Highland Culture Art held by the Taitung County Art and Culture Center (臺東縣立文化中心) at the Taiwan Provincial Social Education Center in Taitung (臺灣省立臺東社會教育館, Today's National Taitung Living Art Center), inspiring him to learn wood carving. The following year, with the support of journalist Yang Yu-ho, he showed work (three wood sculptures) for the first time in an exhibition in Taitung, catching the attention of one of the judges, reputed painter Tu Jo-chou (杜若洲). In 1989, the Taitung County government held an art competition for the six largest Indigenous tribes in the county and commissioned Haku to carve 18 trophies for the event. Lengthy articles on the subject were printed in numerous newspapers.

In January 1991, the magazine Wenshun (文訊雜誌) held the Taitung Art and Culture Forum at the Social Education Center in Taitung, and Haku was invited to talk about his work and was interviewed about his family and work. The interview and Tu Jo-chou’s review were published in the magazine in February, publicizing his work throughout Taiwan. That same year, the reputed Taiwanese art magazine Lion Art (雄獅美術) interviewed him and made a cover story about him in a special issue on “new Indigenous art.” Later in Taipei, he held the Dignity of a Chief: Haku’s First Wood Sculpture Exhibition at the Lion Art Gallery (雄獅藝廊) in Taipei, his first solo show. These publications and the show have been called a watershed moment for bringing Taiwan’s Indigenous art into the modern and contemporary art realms.

In 1994, he established the Haku Studio in Kasavakan, where he sculpted, exhibited art, and worked in education and promotion. In 1998, he received funding from the Council for Cultural Affairs for the “Revival of Local Traditional Industry Project,” through which he founded the Kasavakan Wood Carving Village, where he taught and promoted wood carving in the community. In 2010, the Taiwan Province Handicraft Research Center (國立手工藝研究所, today's National Taiwan Craft Research and Development Institute) named Haku’s family a “Craft Family of Taiwan” and built a gallery and classroom in Haku’s house as a means of exhibiting and promoting his work.

In 1999, his work was shown at the Chinese Information and Culture Center (紐約中華文化中心, today's Taipei Cultural Center in New York (TCC)) in New York, marking his first overseas exhibition. In 1999 and 2001, he showed at the Taitung Austronesian Cultural Festival (臺東南島文化節). In 2002, he exhibited upon invitation at the Manhattan Center. In 2003, he showed upon invitation at TaiwanFest in Vancouver. As a result, his work began receiving praise in the West.

In 2003, the Taitung County Government named him the second “Accomplished Veteran Artist of Taitung” (an annually given honor), and in 2010, he won the 1st Indigenous Craft Heritage Award.

== Style ==
All of Haku’s work is wood carving, most pieces being large. By and large, the Taiwan culture circle has affirmed his work as an iconic example of modern Taiwanese Indigenous wood sculpture that faithfully portrays Taiwanese Indigenous people in their home communities and their cultural spirit.

The grand majority of his work is sculpture in the round made from camphorwood. After choosing a piece of wood, based on his concept and design, he first uses a saw to cut the wood, which is followed by a utility knife to add detail and then polishing with high-grit sandpaper. His method creates unevenness on the surface, which he believes enhances the experience and stimulation when it is touched, in turn adding to the art’s sense of vitality. The unevenness also produces a play of light and shadow, furthering its 3-D feeling while the especially crude-looking surface gives the art a primitive type of beauty.

His art has a strong sense of realism as he excels at portraying human features and gestures of expression, which make apparent the age and character of his sculpted figures, and the way they are adorned gives information about their identities. The inspiration for his work comes from things, people, and animals in the everyday life of the people in his community. Most of his work depicts traditional activities of Indigenous people, such as hunting, pounding millet with a pestle, and dancing. His work differs from the relief sculpture and vessel/implement decoration of Paiwan and Rukai art and clearly fits the definition of modern sculpture.

He consciously presents features of Puyuma culture in his work, such as giving figures traditional clothing unique to the Puyuma people and portraying such culturally significant things as rituals, farming, everyday activities, and orally transmitted stories, making his work easily recognized. He believes his art is merely an extraction of his cultural roots and that it contains the Puyuma spirit.

== Awards ==
- 1997 Award of Merit for a live production/performance at the Community Friendship Culture Festival held by the Ministry of the Interior
- 1998 Award of Excellence in the Indigenous craft category at the 10th Taiwan Folk Art Carnival held by the Taitung County Government
- 2003 Named the second Accomplished Veteran Artist of Taitung
- 2010 1st Indigenous Craft Heritage Award
