= Thuman =

Thuman थुमन
- Village development committee
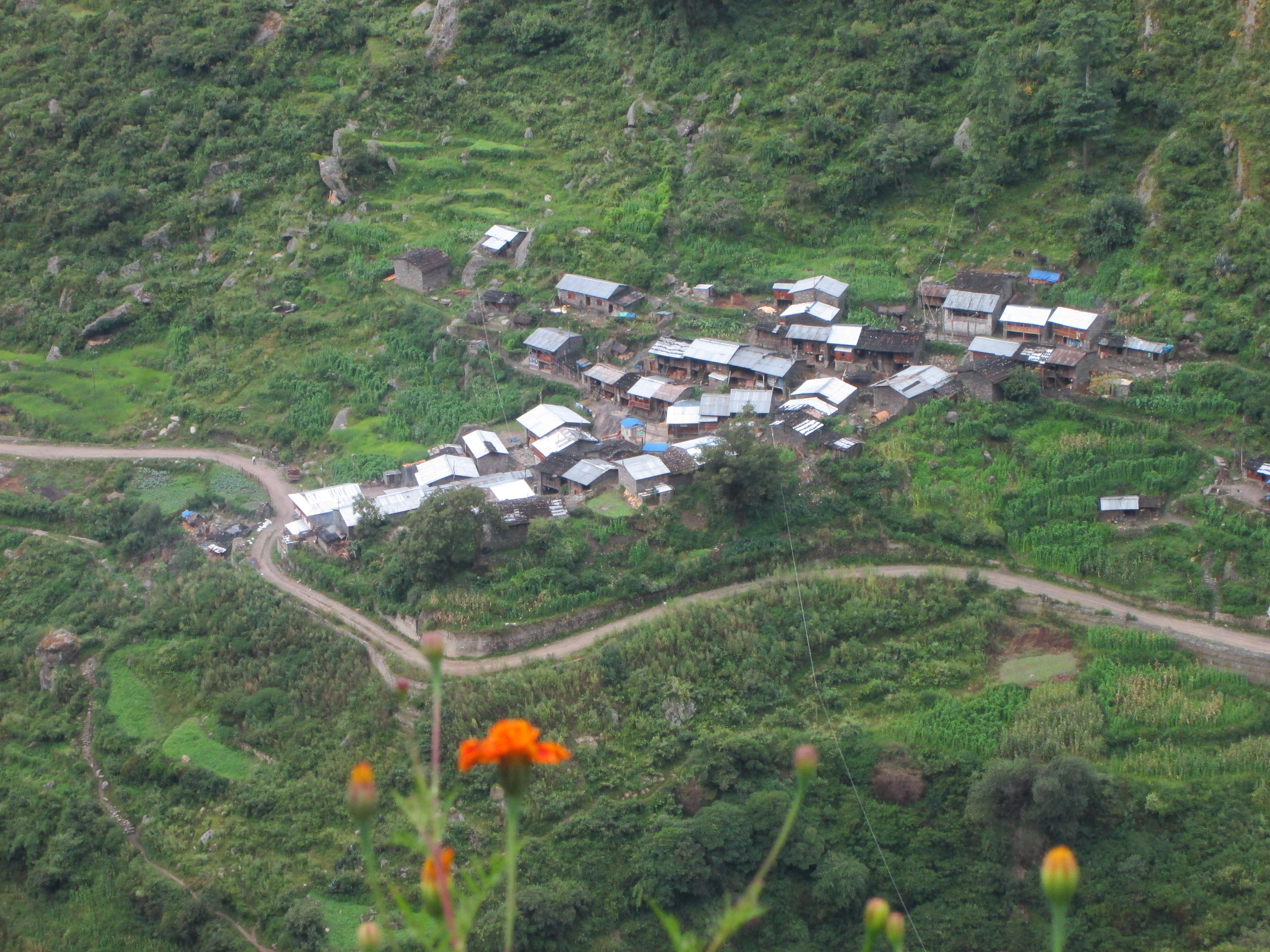
- Thuman village in 2013

- Location in Nepal
- Coordinates: 28.26°N 85.34°E
- Country: Nepal
- Zone: Bagmati Zone
- District: Rasuwa District

Population (1991)
  - Total: 929
- Time zone: UTC+5:45 (Nepal Time)

Thuman is a village development committee in Rasuwa District in the Bagmati Zone of northern Nepal. At the time of the 1991 Nepal census it had a population of 929 people living in 188 individual households.

== Government ==
The purpose of Village Development Committees is to organise village people structurally at a local level and creating a partnership between the community and the public sector for improved service delivery system. A VDC has a status as an autonomous institution and authority for interacting with the more centralised institutions of governance in Nepal. In doing so, the VDC gives village people an element of control and responsibility in development, and also ensures proper utilization and distribution of state funds and a greater interaction between government officials, NGOs and agencies. The village development committees within a given area will discuss education, water supply, basic health, sanitation and income and will also monitor and record progress which is displayed in census data.

In VDCs there is one elected chief, usually elected with over an 80% majority. From each ward, there is also a chief that is elected along with these there are also four members elected or nominated.

The 2026 Tuhman village landslide

was a landslide event that affected Tuhman village in Nepal in 2026. The event occurred during a period of intense monsoonal rainfall, which increased soil saturation and destabilized the steep mountainous slopes surrounding the settlement. Landslides and related floods are recurrent natural hazards in Nepal, particularly during the summer monsoon season, when prolonged and intense precipitation can trigger the failure of weathered and fractured mountain slopes. The Tuhman event caused significant disruption to the local community and damaged property and infrastructure, prompting emergency and relief efforts. The landslide was part of a broader pattern of rainfall-related slope failures reported across Nepal during the 2026 monsoon season.
