= Chilime Hydropower Plant =

Chilime
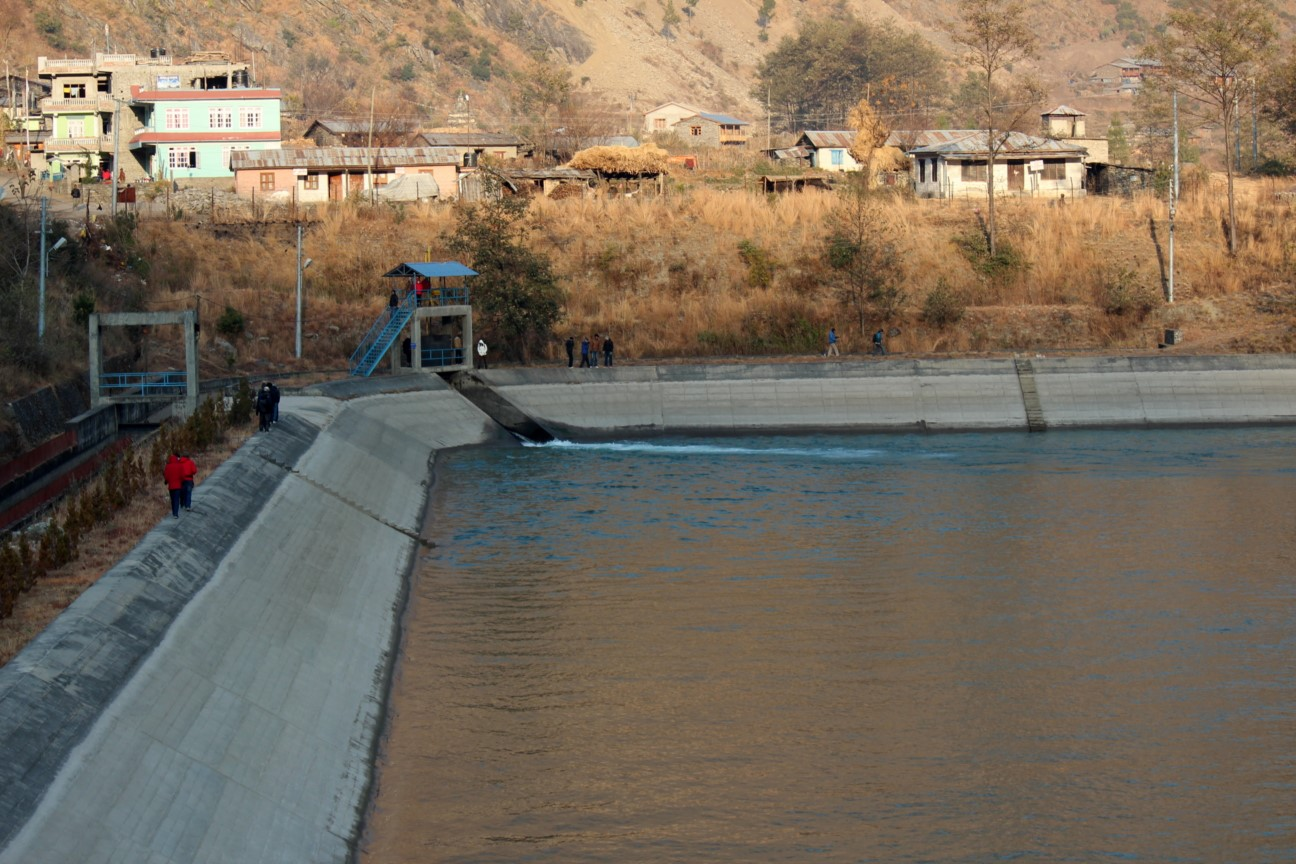
- Power house

- Location within Nepal
- Official name: Chilime Hydroelectric Plant
- Country: Nepal
- Location: Chilime
- Coordinates: 28°11′11.47″N 85°17′59.83″E
- Purpose: Power
- Opening date: 2003
- Construction cost: Rs. 248 crore (approx)
- Owner: Chilime Hydropower Company Limited

Dam and spillways
- Type of dam: Gravity, weir
- Impounds: Chilime River
- Height: 3.25 m (10.7 ft)
- Length: 13 m (43 ft)

Reservoir
- Creates: Chilime Peaking Pond
- Total capacity: 53,032 m^{3} (42.994 acre⋅ft)

Chilime Hydropower Plant
- Coordinates: 28°9′26.45″N 85°19′55.22″E
- Operator: Chilime Hydropower Company Limited
- Commission date: 2003
- Type: Run-of-the-river
- Hydraulic head: 351.5 m (1,153 ft) (gross)
- Turbines: 2 x 11.28 MW Pelton-type
- Installed capacity: 22.1 MW
- Annual generation: 132.918 GWh
- Website http://www.chilime.com.np

Chilime Hydropower Plant (also known as Chilime) is hydro power plant in Nepal. During 2026 Nepal–Tibet floods, the plant sustained damages, whose scale is yet unknown.

The power plant supplies electricity in bulk to Nepal Electricity Authority (NEA) at a long-term PPA price. It generates an annual energy output of around 150 GWh.

== History ==
The Chilime Hydropower Company, also referred to as Chilime, was established in 1995 with the primary goal of generating hydroelectricity by making the most efficient use of hydro resources available within the Nepal

Currently, Chilime possesses and manages a 22.1 MW power plant, which became operational on August 25, 2003. The facility is situated in Rasuwa district, approximately 133 km north of the capital city, Kathmandu. The produced electricity is transmitted to the national grid through a 38 km 66 kV single circuit transmission line. The majority of the powerhouse facilities are located underground, leaving only the switchyard on the surface. The power plant utilizes two horizontal axis Pelton turbines, each with a capacity of 11.28 MW.

The plant was heavily damaged by the 2026 Nepal–Tibet floods. As of 23 September, 5 employees died and 1 employee remains missing.

== Shareholding ==
NEA holds majority ownership with 51% share holding, while the remaining 49% shareholding comes from the general public, including 10 percent equity ownership from local residents. The Chilime project in Nepal was the first to allocate 10 percent of its shares to local communities as part of a benefit-sharing initiative. Residents from all three neighboring villages were eligible to receive these shares.

== Export ==
In November 2022, the NEA obtained India's authorization to export 22 megawatts of power generated by the Chilime Hydropower Company.

== Gallery ==
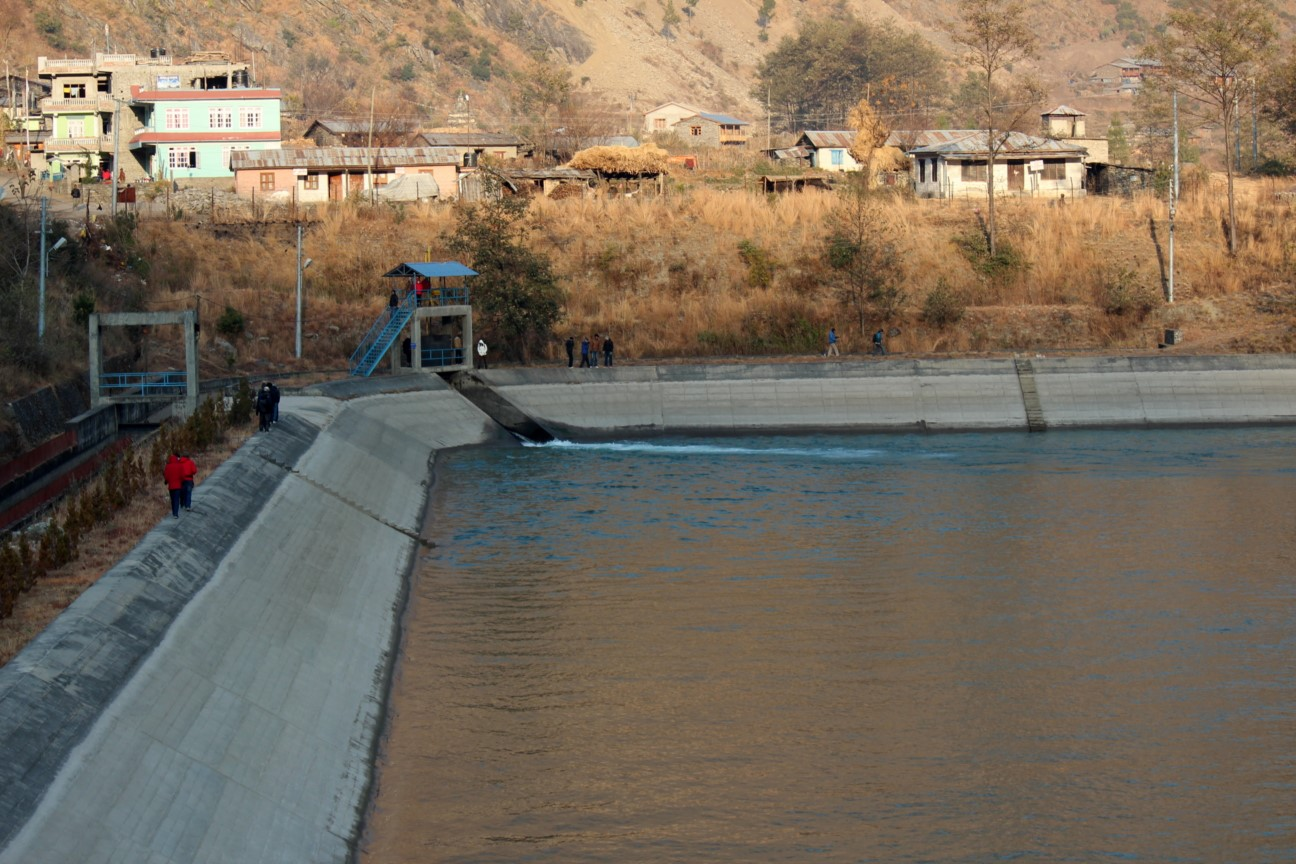
Dam of Chilime Hydropower

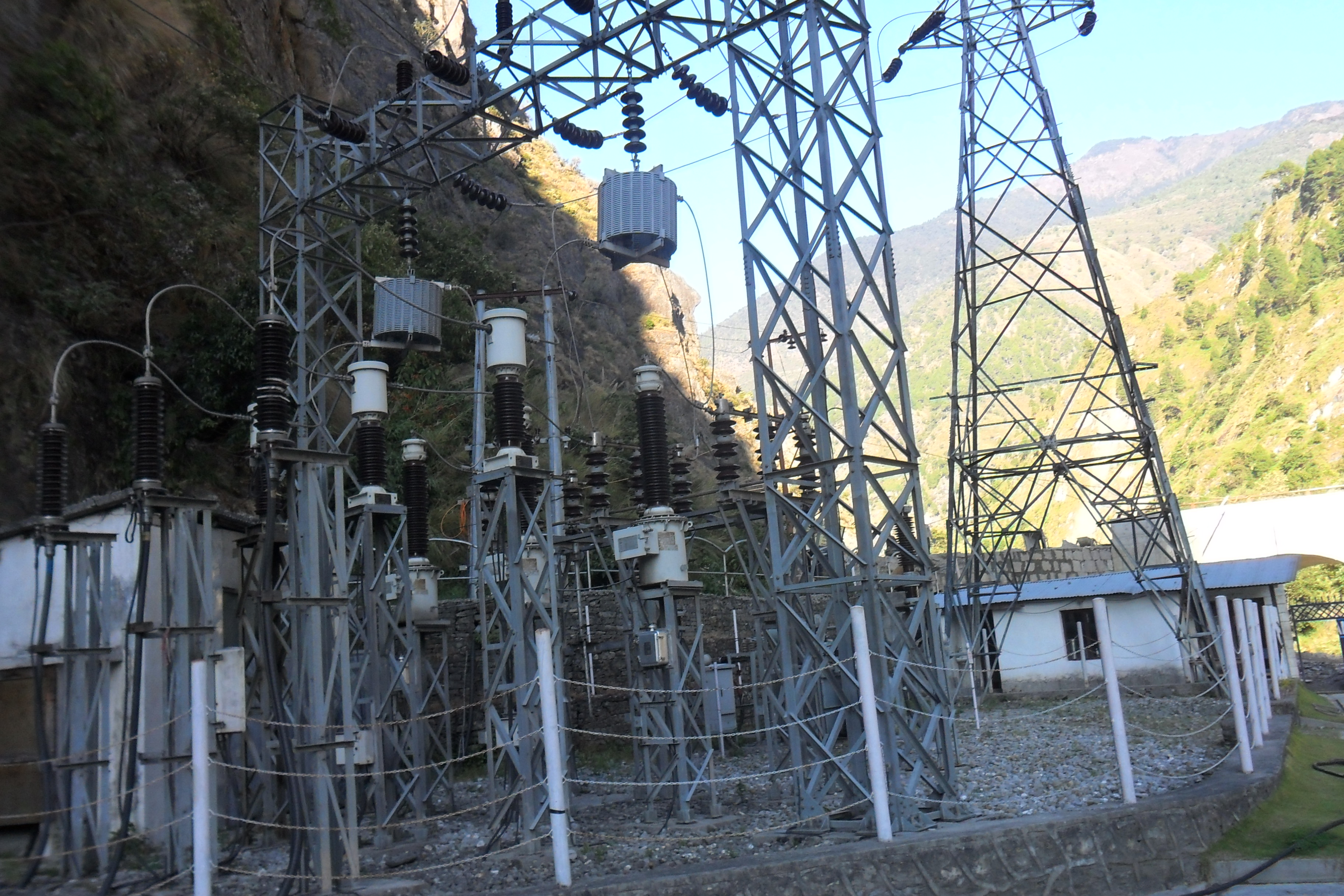
Switchyard

== See also ==
- Kaligandaki A
- Nepal Electricity Authority
