= Haku (surname) =

Haku (written: 白 or 朴) is a Japanese surname. Notable people with the surname include:

- Shinkun Haku (白 眞勲, born 1958), Japanese politician
- Kiyoko Haku (朴 清子), better known as Kiyoko Arai, Japanese manga artist
- Maki Haku (白 巻, 1924–2000), Japanese artist
