= Dandagaun, Kavrepalanchok =

Dandagaun डाँडागाउँ
- VDC
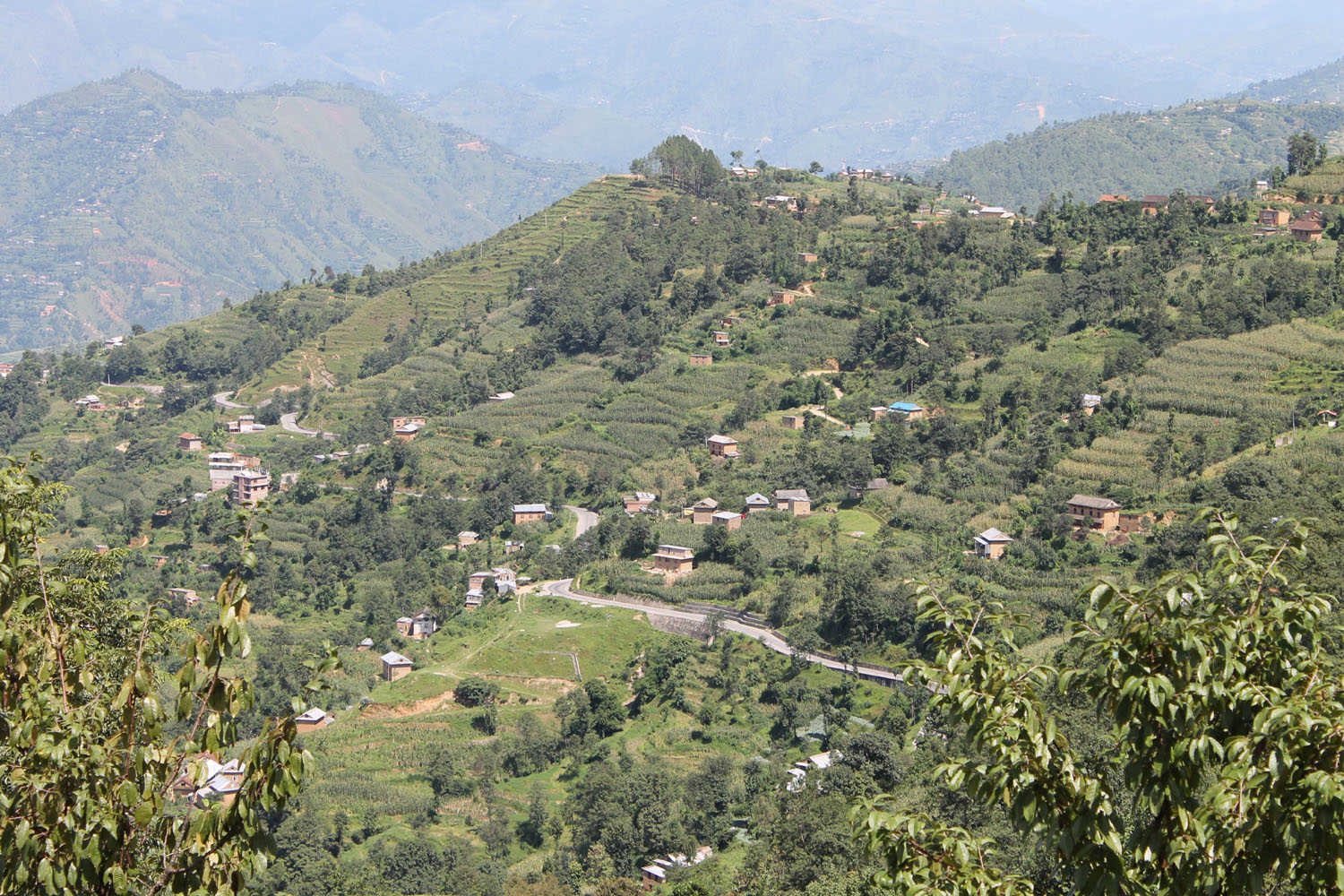
- Belagaun of Dandagaun VDC

- Location in Nepal
- Coordinates: 27.54°N 85.53°E
- Country: Nepal
- Province: Bagmati Province
- District: Kabhrepalanchok District

Population (1991)
  - Total: 2,365
- Time zone: UTC+5:45 (Nepal Time)

Dandagaun is a Village Development Committee in Kabhrepalanchok District in Bagmati Province of central Nepal. At the time of the 1991 Nepal census it had a population of 2,365 and had 374 houses in it.
