= Dhunche =

Dhunche धुन्चे Dhunlang
- Village
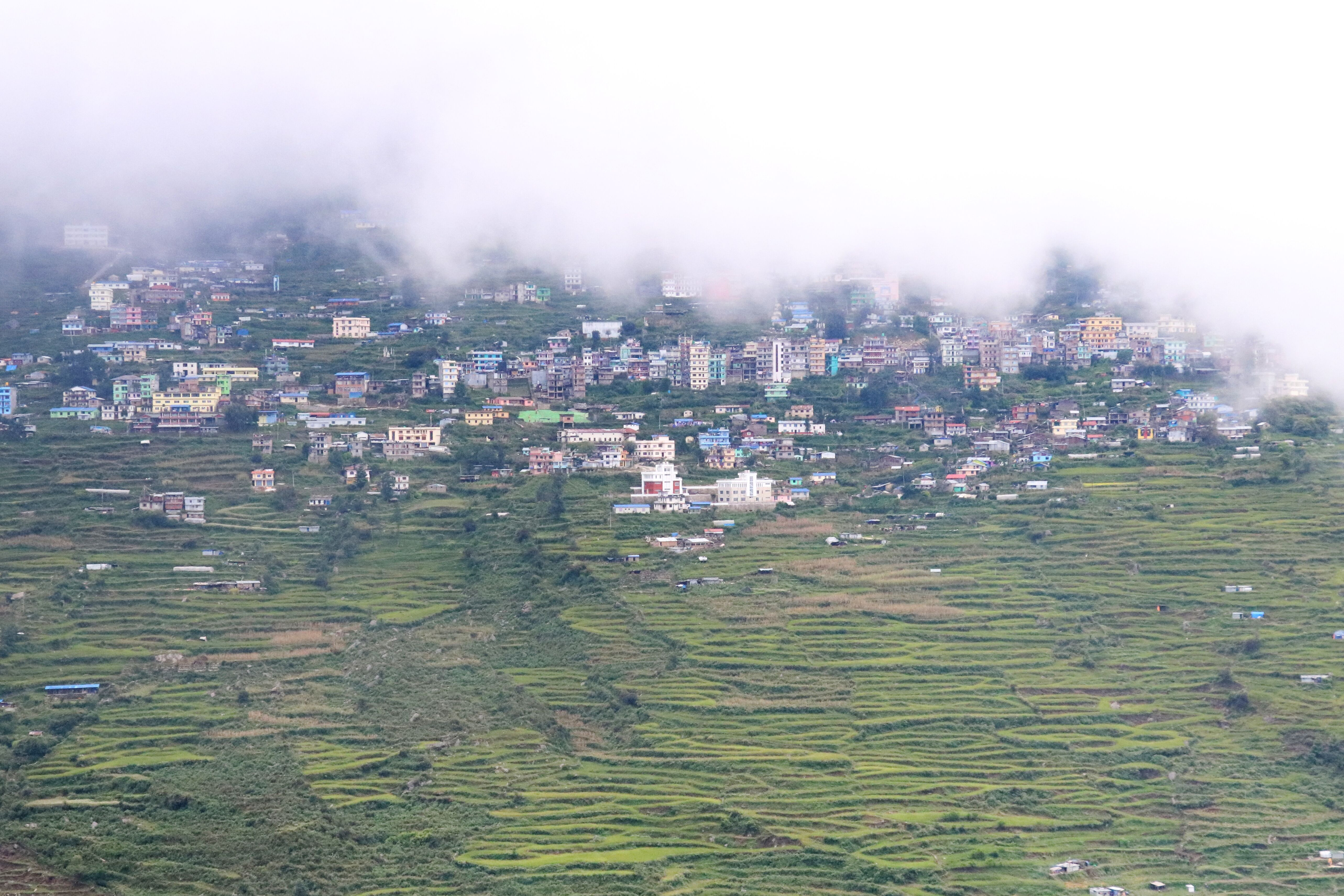
- Dhunche in 2019

- Location in Bagmati Province, Nepal Dhunche (Nepal)
- Coordinates: 28°6′42″N 85°17′52″E
- Country: Nepal
- Province: Bagmati Province
- District: Rasuwa District
- Rural municipality: Gosaikunda Rural Municipality
- Ward: 6
- Elevation: 2,030 m (6,660 ft)

Population (2011)
  - Total: 2,744
- Former Dhunche Village Development Committee
- Time zone: UTC+5:45 (Nepal Time)
- Area code: 010

Dhunche (धुन्चे) is a village and the administrative headquarters of Rasuwa District in Bagmati Province, Nepal. The settlement forms Ward No. 6 of Gosaikunda Rural Municipality; before Nepal's local-government restructuring it was a separate village development committee. The 2011 Nepal census recorded 2,744 people living in 714 households in the former Dhunche VDC. Dhunche lies at an elevation of approximately 2,030 metres (6,660 ft) above sea level. Dhunche is also the administrative headquarters of Langtang National Park. Radio Rasuwa, a local community radio station, broadcasts from Dhunche on 102.1 MHz.

== Transport ==
Dhunche lies on the Pasang Lhamu Highway, designated National Highway 18 (NH18). The highway connects the Kathmandu area with Trishuli, Dhunche and Syabrubesi. The Nepal Tourism Board gives the road distance between Kathmandu and Dhunche as approximately 117 kilometres (73 mi).

== History ==
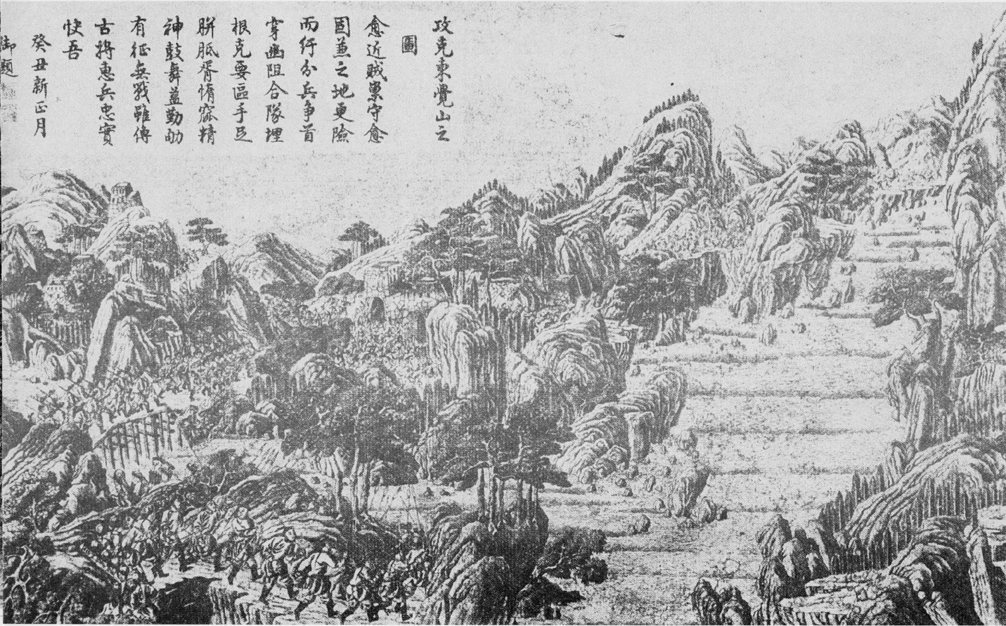
A Qing depiction of the 1792 battle at Mount Dongjiao

The area around present-day Dhunche is associated with fighting during the second campaign of the Sino-Nepalese War in 1792. Historian Lucette Boulnois identified the Dongjiao or Dongjiao-shan mentioned in Chinese accounts of the campaign with the mountainous area around modern Dhunche. Qing forces under Fuk'anggan pursued the withdrawing Gorkhali army through the region during the campaign.

== 2026 Rasuwa flood ==
On 26 August 2026, a major flash flood affected northern Rasuwa District along the Bhote Koshi–Trishuli river system. Timure, Rasuwagadhi and Syabrubesi were among the settlements most severely affected, with damage reported to roads, bridges, markets, government facilities and hydropower infrastructure. Dhunche functioned as an important administrative, relief and evacuation point during the response. The Nepali Army reported evacuating people from several affected locations in Rasuwa, including Timure, Syabrubesi, Dhunche and Mailung, using helicopters and ground teams. Mobile communications in Dhunche were disrupted following the flood. Nepal Telecom subsequently restored mobile service after technicians were transported to the area by helicopter.

== Climate ==
Climate data for Dhunche, elevation 1,982 m (6,503 ft)
| Month | Jan | Feb | Mar | Apr | May | Jun | Jul | Aug | Sep | Oct | Nov | Dec | Year |
|---|---|---|---|---|---|---|---|---|---|---|---|---|---|
| Mean daily maximum °C (°F) | 13.7 (56.7) | 15.9 (60.6) | 20.9 (69.6) | 24.1 (75.4) | 24.9 (76.8) | 24.1 (75.4) | 23.2 (73.8) | 23.2 (73.8) | 22.4 (72.3) | 21.7 (71.1) | 17.3 (63.1) | 14.4 (57.9) | 20.5 (68.9) |
| Mean daily minimum °C (°F) | 2.2 (36.0) | 3.3 (37.9) | 7.5 (45.5) | 9.6 (49.3) | 12.2 (54.0) | 14.9 (58.8) | 15.6 (60.1) | 15.2 (59.4) | 14.1 (57.4) | 10.5 (50.9) | 5.8 (42.4) | 2.9 (37.2) | 9.5 (49.1) |
| Average precipitation mm (inches) | 43.2 (1.70) | 55.7 (2.19) | 67.9 (2.67) | 85.5 (3.37) | 110.7 (4.36) | 254.9 (10.04) | 438.4 (17.26) | 454.8 (17.91) | 283.2 (11.15) | 94.4 (3.72) | 26.1 (1.03) | 25.7 (1.01) | 1,940.5 (76.40) |
Source 1: Australian National University
Source 2: Japan International Cooperation Agency (precipitation)
