= TaiwanFest =

Taiwanese cultural fest

Taiwanfest, stylized TAIWANfest, formerly known as the Taiwanese Composers Music Festival, is an annual cultural festival held in Vancouver and Toronto. The original focus of TAIWANfest was to celebrate Taiwanese culture, however, in recent years, the festival expanded to include dialogues with local Canadian communities including Indigenous communities, Asian-Canadian communities, and other Asian cultures. It is reported to be the largest English/Mandarin bilingual cultural festival in Canada.

== History ==
In 1990, Chen Huizhong of Vancouver Formosa Academy hosted the "Night of Taiwanese Composers Music Concert," which included a performance by renowned musician Tyzen Hsiao. In 1991, Vancouver Formosa Academy held the "Taiwanese Composers Piano Concert," which introduced and shared Taiwanese culture to Canadians. In the same year, the Taiwanese Canadian Cultural Society was established. In 1992, the Taiwanese Canadian Cultural Society and Vancouver Formosa Academy together hosted the "Indoor Taiwanese Composers Music Concert." In 1994, the event was expanded into a cultural festival, which included three concerts, a film exhibition, live lectures, and cultural seminars. To accommodate the changes, the festival was renamed once again as "TAIWANfest," though the focus of the event remained on the live concert. As TAIWANfest continued to expand, in 2004, the Taiwanese Canadian Cultural Society established the Taiwanese Canadian Special Events Association to work on organizing the event. In 2009, the Asian Canadian Special Events Association (formerly known as the Taiwanese Canadian Special Events Association) was given full authority to host TAIWANfest.

== Dialogues with Asia Timeline (2016 onwards) ==
Year	Theme	Introduction
2016	A Cultural Tango with Hong Kong	Beginning this year, TAIWANfest pivoted its concept from focusing exclusively on Taiwan to opening up dialogues with other cultures. TAIWANfest transformed into a platform for multicultural exchange with local Canadian communities, highlighting the diversity, freedom, and uniqueness of Taiwanese culture within Asia. In the five-year "Dialogues with Asia" project, the first year's theme was A Cultural Tango with Hong Kong. The festival focused on the similarities of language, food, culture, and society between Taiwan and Hong Kong. A symphony orchestra and traditional music performance paid tribute to Teresa Teng and Leslie Cheung. "The Face Cultures - Photography and Art Exhibition" portrayed the true faces under the mask of mainstream society; the exhibition depicted moments of social conflict such as the Sunflower Student Movement in Taiwan and the Umbrella Movement of Hong Kong. A large mural of photographer Stan Douglas' photo was displayed against a building wall; the photograph captured the 1971 Gastown Riots in Vancouver, a parallel on police brutality against the people with the protests in Taiwan and Hong Kong.
2017	Kanpai Japan!	The "Who Am I? Visual Arts Exhibition" displayed works from Taiwan's esteemed artists including Chen Cheng-po, Yang San Lang, and Chen Chine Fen for the first time in North America. The exhibition displays the works from the first generation of Western-style painters who received Japanese education. The Deputy Consul General of Japan attended TAIWANfest in Toronto.
2018	Fête with the Philippines	The dialogue between Taiwan and the Philippines starts with the shared language origins from the Austronesian language family, and the similar stories of immigration to Canada. Performances included Auba Rukai Children's Choir, Taipei Philharmonic Youth Ensemble, Principal Cello Jamie Chan, and Filipino-Canadian Juno Award nominee Warren Dean Flandez.
2019	Riding the Waves with Vietnam	TAIWANfest explored similar histories of colonialism and displacement between Taiwan and Vietnam through art inspired by the concept of "resilience". The resilience of the people can be seen in their perseverance in surviving, rebuilding, and reclaiming their own national identity despite the tumultuous society left behind by colonizers. Vietnamese host and new Taiwanese resident Nguyễn Thu Hằng was invited to host the opening ceremonies. Performances included Ju Percussion Group, Sorry Youth band, visual artist Wen Cheng Lee, Godki Dlla, and Amis singer Suana.
2020	The Survived	Due to the COVID-19 pandemic, the five-year project "Dialogues with Asia" was paused. The theme of The Survived reflected life during a pandemic, with the goal of using arts and culture to explore new ways of sustainable living. The festival shifted to virtual events, including "The Island and the Maple Leaf" online symphony, featuring pre-recorded performances of 47 musicians performing from their homes. Taiwan's Minister of Culture Lee Yung-te, Canada's Minister of Cultural Assets Steven Guilbeault, and Premier of British Columbia John Horgan all attended the online opening ceremony.
