= Haku, Jumla =

Haku, Nepal हाकु Aaireni
- Municipality
- Location in Nepal
- Coordinates: 29.17°N 82.18°E
- Country: Nepal
- Zone: Karnali Zone
- District: Jumla District

Government
  - Education Expert: Harihar Neupane

Population (2011)
  - Total: 6,312
- Time zone: UTC+5:45 (Nepal Time)

Haku is a village development committee in Jumla District in the Karnali Zone of north-western Nepal. At the time of the 1991 Nepal census it had a population of 1683 persons living in 310 individual households.
