= Bhorle, Rasuwa =

Coordinates: 27°59′N 85°14′E

Bhorle भोर्ले
- Village Development Committee
- Interactive map of Bhorle
- Country: Nepal
- Zone: Bagmati Zone
- District: Rasuwa District

Population (1991)
  - Total: 4,884
- Time zone: UTC+5:45 (Nepal Time)

Bhorle is the Village Development Committee in Rasuwa District in the Bagmati Zone of northern Nepal. At the time of the 1991 Nepal census, it had a population of 4884 people residing in 903 individual households.

== Government ==
The purpose of Village Development Committees is to organise village people structurally at a local level and creating a partnership between the community and the public sector for improved service delivery system. A VDC has a status as an autonomous institution and authority for interacting with the more centralised institutions of governance in Nepal. In doing so, the VDC gives village people an element of control and responsibility in development, and also ensures proper utilization and distribution of state funds and a greater interaction between government officials, NGOs, and agencies. The village development committees within a given area will discuss education, water supply, basic health, sanitation and income and will also monitor and record progress which is displayed in census data.

In VDCs, there is one elected chief, usually elected with over an 80% majority. From each ward, there is also a chief that is elected along with these there are also four members elected or nominated.
