= Rasuwa District =

Rasuwa District रसुवा जिल्ला
- District
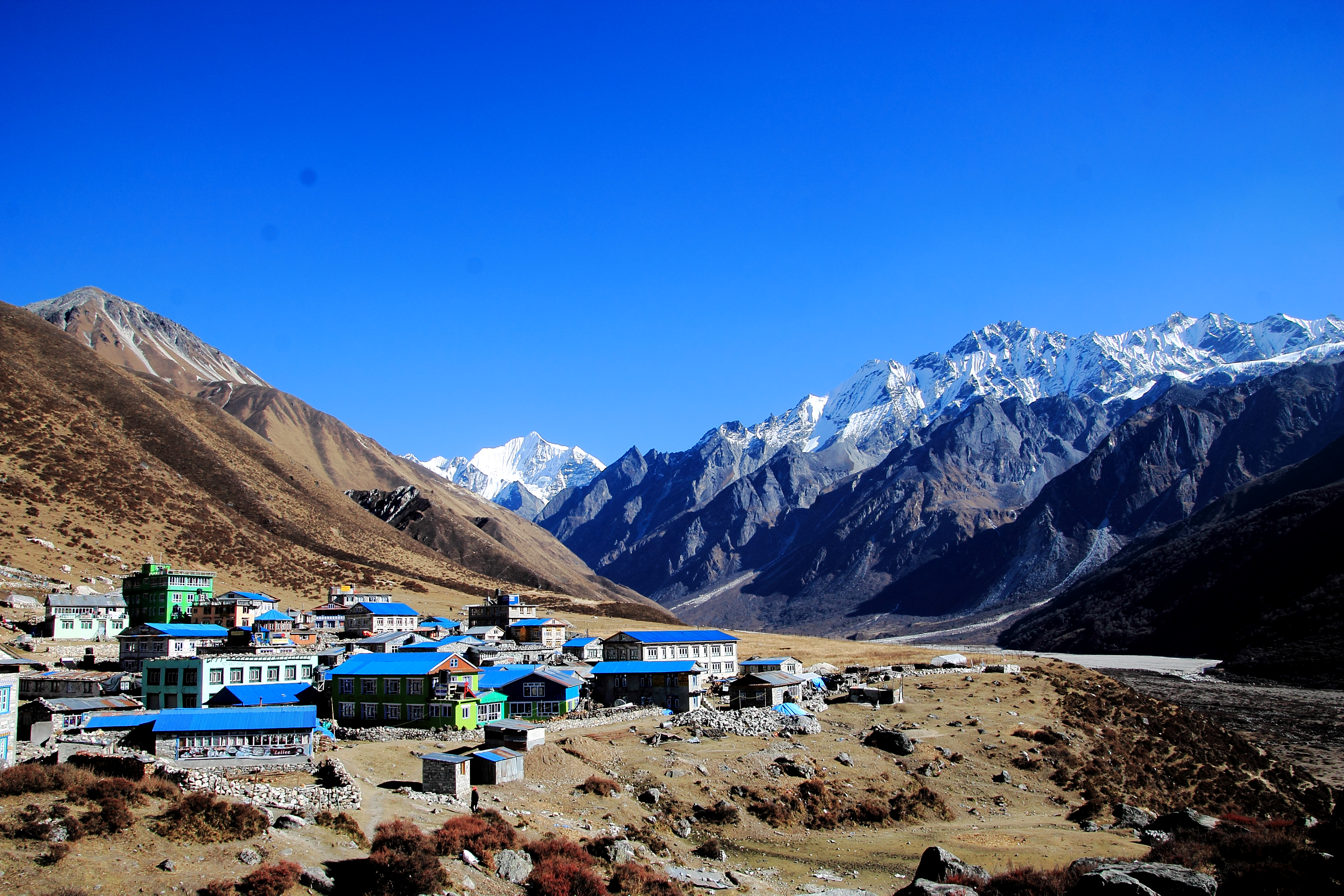
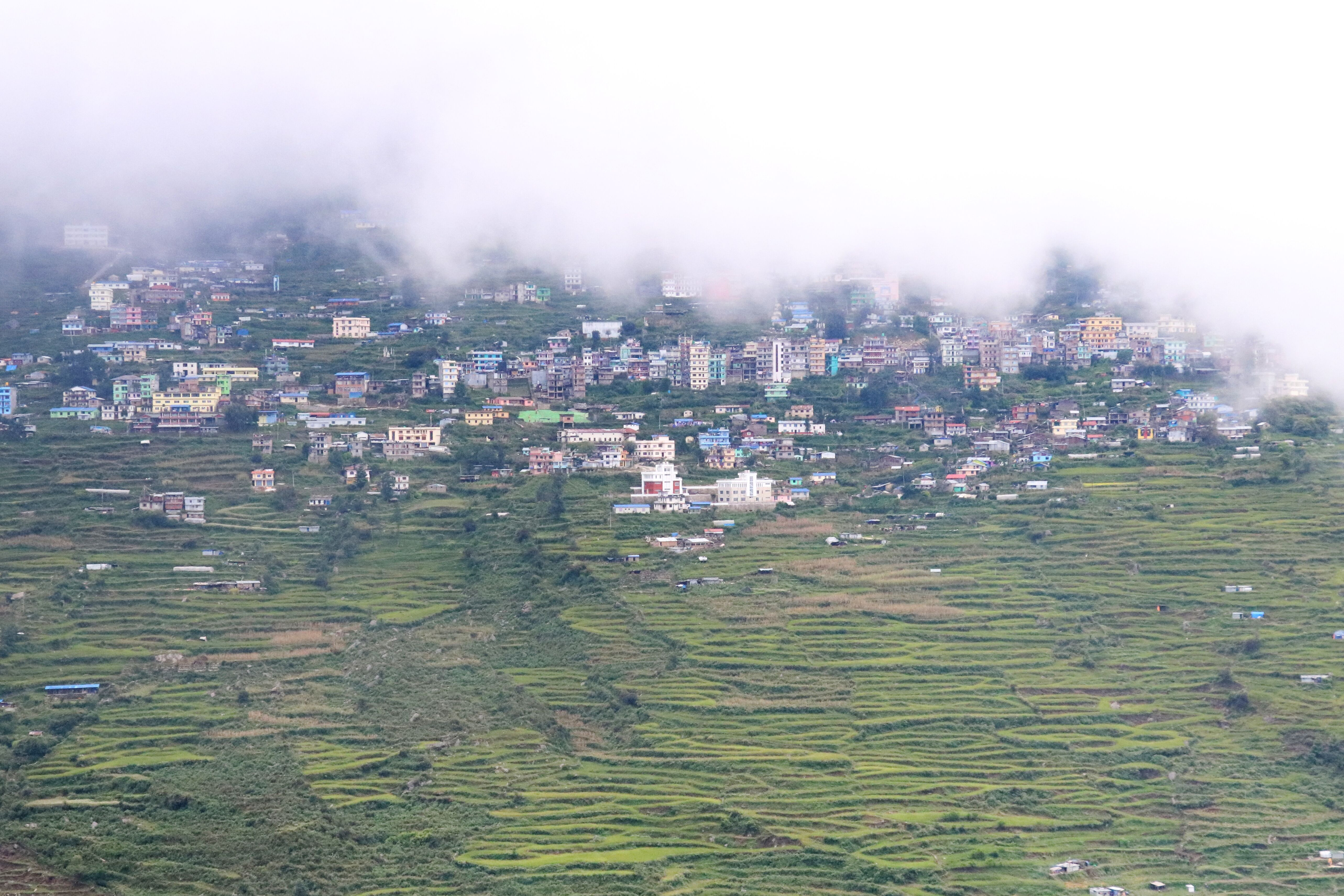
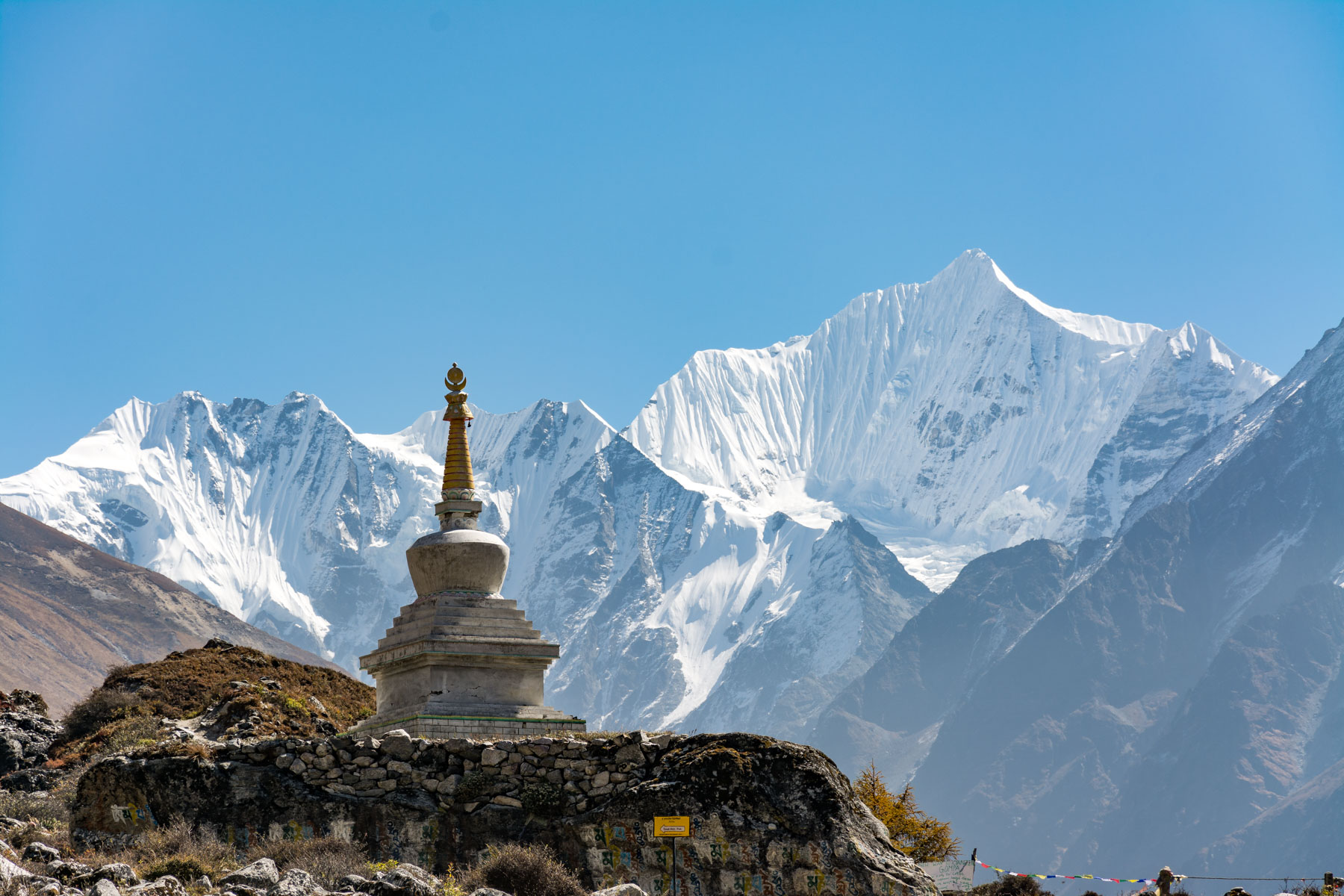
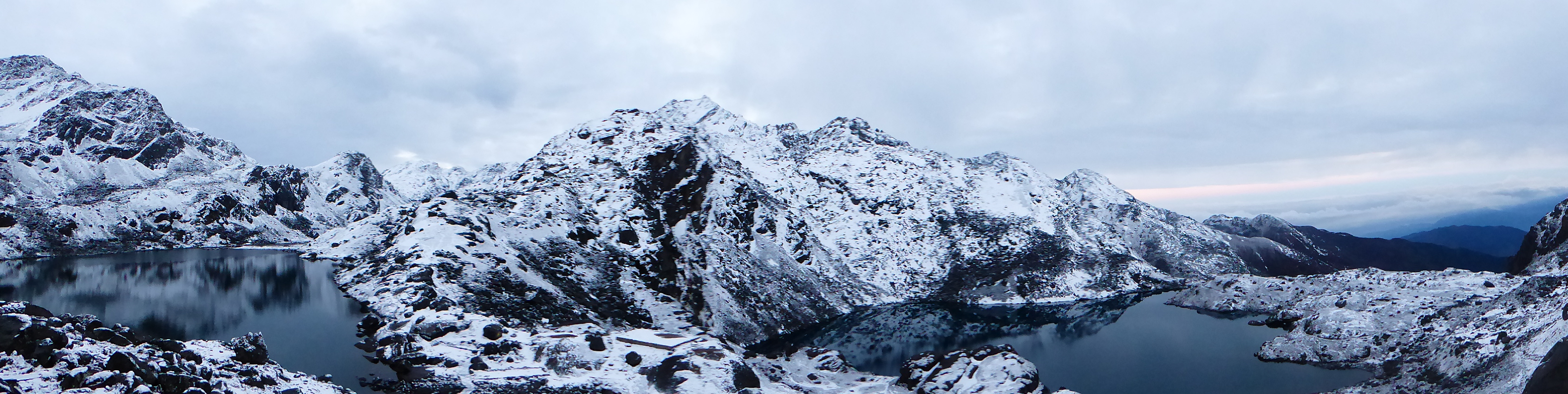
- Clockwise from top: Kyanjing Gompa village, Stupa near Langtang village on a popular trek route, Panorama of Gosaikunda lake, Dhunche— the headquarter of Rasuwa district

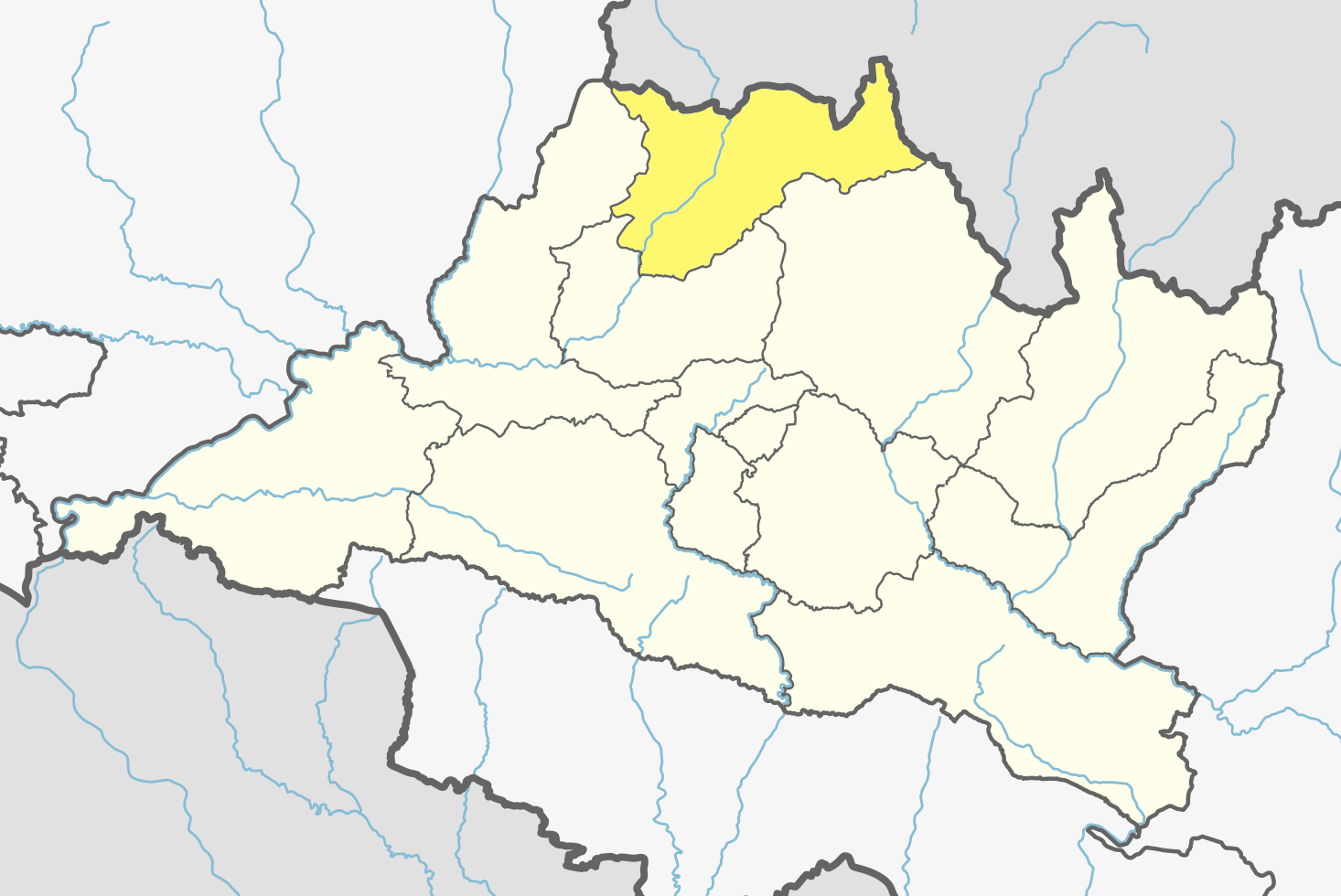
- Location of district in province
- Interactive map of Rasuwa District
- Coordinates: 28°9′54″N 85°20′27″E
- Country: Nepal
- Province: Bagmati Province
- Established: 1962
- Admin HQ.: Dhunche, Gosaikunda Rural Municipality

Government
  - Type: Coordination committee
  - Body: DCC, Rasuwa
  - Chief District Officer: Naba Raj Jaisi

Area
  - Total: 1,544 km^{2} (596 sq mi)

Population (2011)
  - Total: 43,300
  - Density: 28.0/km^{2} (72.6/sq mi)
- Time zone: UTC+05:45 (NPT)
- Main Language(s): Nepali, Tamang

Rasuwa District (Nepali: रसुवा जिल्ला) is one of 13 districts of Bagmati Province and one of seventy-seven districts of Nepal. The district, with Dhunche, Gosaikunda Rural Municipality as its district headquarters, covers an area of 1,544 km^{2} (596 sq mi) and has a population (2011) of 43,300. Its District Post Office (DPO) has a Rasuwa DPO code of 45000. There are five post offices in the district. As per census 2011 total households in Rasuwa district were 9,778. It is the smallest district by area, among 16 districts in the Himalaya region of Nepal. The district was heavily damaged by flooding in August 2026.

== Etymology ==
The name, formerly Rasowa, is believed to be derived from two Tibetan words ra (lamb) and sowa (grazing), as it was known for its lamb and grazing lands.

== Geography and climate ==
Climate Zone	Elevation Range	% of Area
Upper Tropical	300 to 1,000 meters 1,000 to 3,300 ft.	1.2%
Subtropical	1,000 to 2,000 meters 3,300 to 6,600 ft.	11.4%
Temperate	2,000 to 3,000 meters 6,400 to 9,800 ft.	20.8%
Subalpine	3,000 to 4,000 meters 9,800 to 13,100 ft.	20.0%
Alpine	4,000 to 5,000 meters 13,100 to 16,400 ft.	11.8%
Nival	above 5,000 meters	32.9%
Transhimalayan	Cold arid or semi-arid	2.0%

Its territory has elevations ranging from 614 to 7,227 meters (2,014 to 23,711 ft) from mean sea Level. Forests cover 31.43% of the land while 16.63% is always snow-covered. The steeply varying territory and scenery make Rasuwa a well-known tourist destination in Nepal. Sightseeing places include Gosaikunda Lake, Langtang valley and hot springs(locally called Tatopani).

== Demographics ==
Historical population
Census year	Pop.	±% p.a.
1981	30,241	—
1991	36,744	+1.97%
2001	44,731	+1.99%
2011	43,300	−0.32%
2021	45,554	+0.51%
Source: Citypopulation

At the time of the 2021 Nepal census, Rasuwa District had a population of 46,689. 8.50% of the population is under 5 years of age. It has a literacy rate of 69.60% and a sex ratio of 943 females per 1000 males. The entire population lives in rural areas.

Castes/ethnic groups in Rasuwa District (2021)
1. Tamang (68.8%)
2. Bahun (13.3%)
3. Ghale (5.17%)
4. Gurung (2.70%)
5. Chhetri (2.62%)
6. Newar (1.84%)
7. Kami (1.80%)
8. Damai (1.18%)
9. Magar (1.13%)
10. Others (1.44%)

Ethnicity wise: Hill Janjatis were the largest group, making up 78% of the population. Tamangs were the largest Hill Janjati group, making up 69% of the population, with smaller populations of Ghale and Gurung. Khas are the second largest group, making up 19% of the population.

Languages of Rasuwa district (2021)
1. Tamang (67.5%)
2. Nepali (24.5%)
3. Ghale (3.80%)
4. Tibetan (1.72%)
5. Others (2.45%)

At the time of the 2021 census, 67.54% of the population spoke Tamang, 24.49% Nepali, 3.80% Ghale and 1.72% Tibetan as their first language. In 2011, 26.5% of the population spoke Nepali as their first language.

Religion in Rasuwa District (2021)
Religion	Percent
Buddhism	70.84%
Hinduism	25.61%
Christianity	3.44%
Other or not stated	0.11%

== Administrative divisions ==
The administrative division of Rasuwa comprised 5 Rural Municipalities.

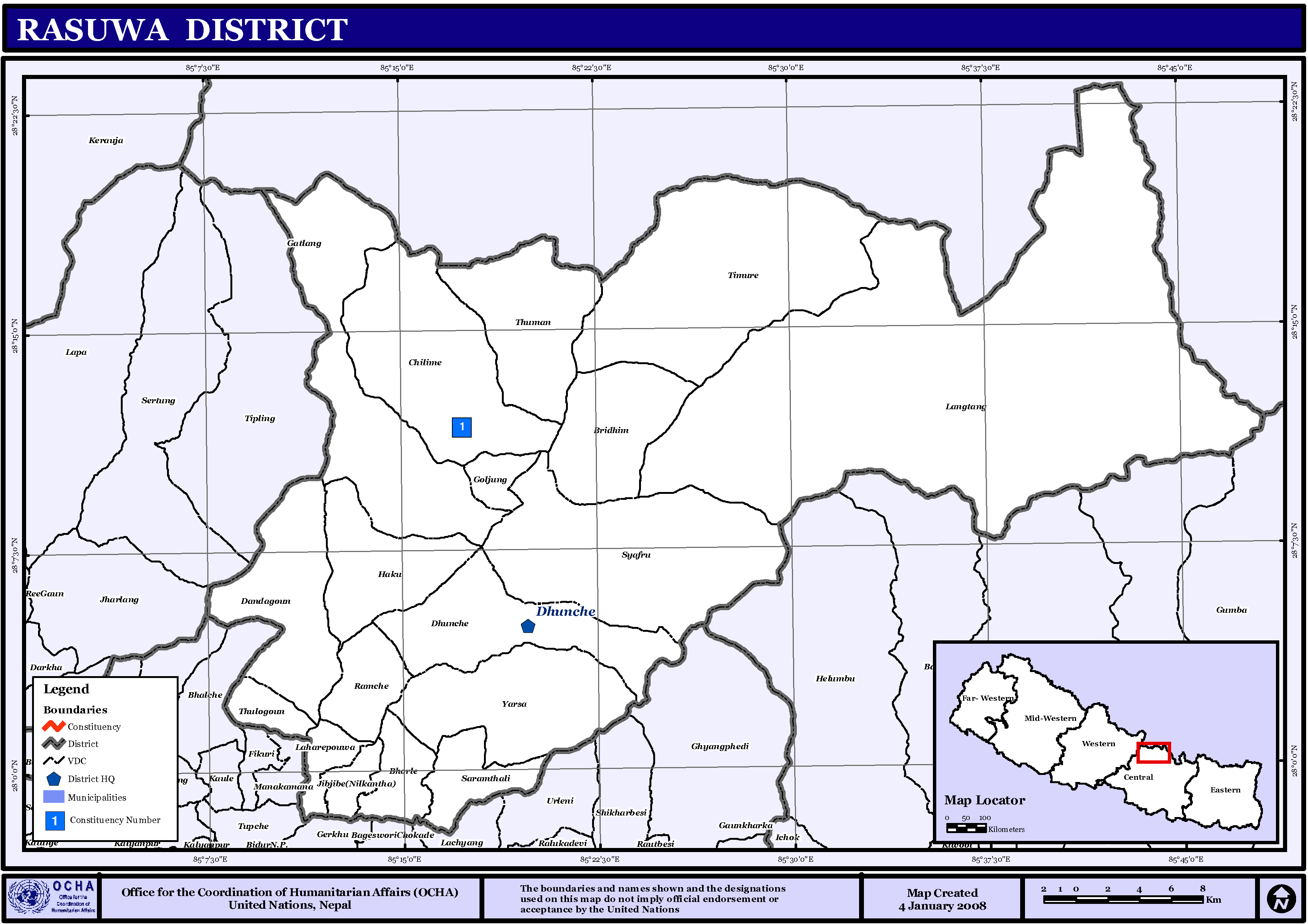
Map of the VDCs in Rasuwa District

Following are five Rural Municipalities in Rasuwa District:

Rural municipalities of Rasuwa District
#	Name	Website
1	Uttargaya Rural Municipality	uttargayamun.gov.np
2	Kalika Rural Municipality	kalikamunrasuwa.gov.np
3	Gosaikunda Rural Municipality	gosaikundamun.gov.np
4	Naukunda Rural Municipality	naukundamun.gov.np
5	Aamachhodingmo Rural Municipality	aamachhodingmomun.gov.np

Many leaders of different parties are here but only 5 mayors are here. Nepali Congress won 2 places, CPN UML won 2 place and Rastriya Prajatantrik Party won 1 seat/place. The first ever person who was elected in Rasuwa from Nepali Congress was Mr. Bal Chandra Poudel (2046 B.S). The history of other parties are not commenced yet but this district in Nepal is also the one with no VDC. The winner of election 2070 BS in this district is Mr. Janardan Dhakal.

== Transportation ==
Rasuwa is accessible by bus from Kathmandu (national capital) via Pasang Lhamu highway (H21), with its headquarters (Dhunche) being about 120 km (75 mi) from Kathmandu. As of 2013, 3 Village Development Committees (VDCs) namely Thuman, Langtang and Haku are not touched by any kind of roadway.

== Tourism ==
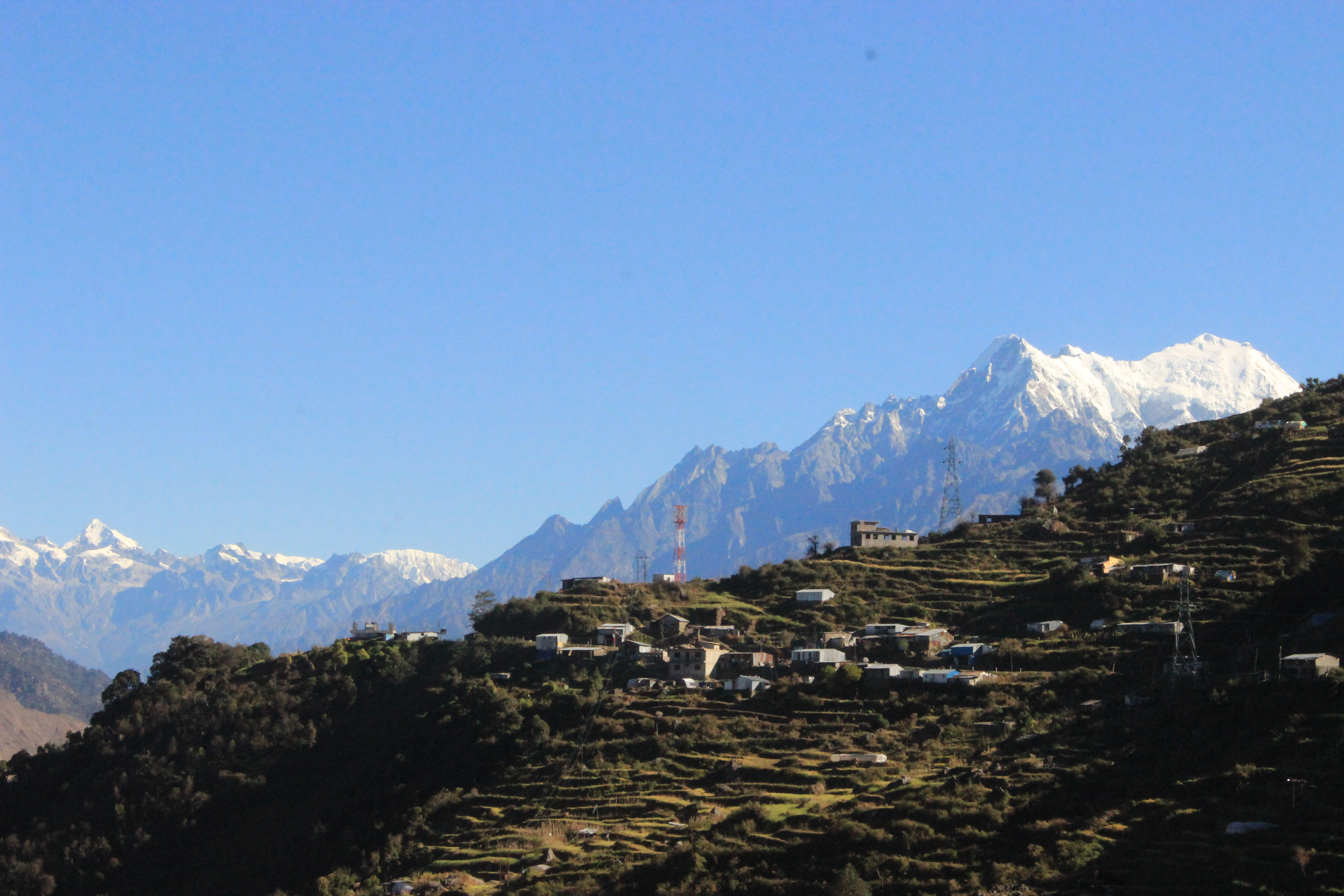
Rasuwa lies in Himalayan region

Rasuwa is rich in natural resources claimed by the Government of Nepal Department of Mines & Geology. The Langtang mountain range stands to the north of Rasuwa. The northern parts of the area largely fall within the boundaries of Langtang National Park. Gosainkunda Lake, Ganja La Pass, and Tamang village in Bridim are the most prominent attractions of Rasuwa for tourists. The Gosainkunda Lake, also known as "Frozen Lake", is a mountain lake in the Langtang region. There are about 108 kundas (lakes) in this area. Saraswati Kund, Bhairab Kund, Surya Kund and Gosainkund are most important ones.

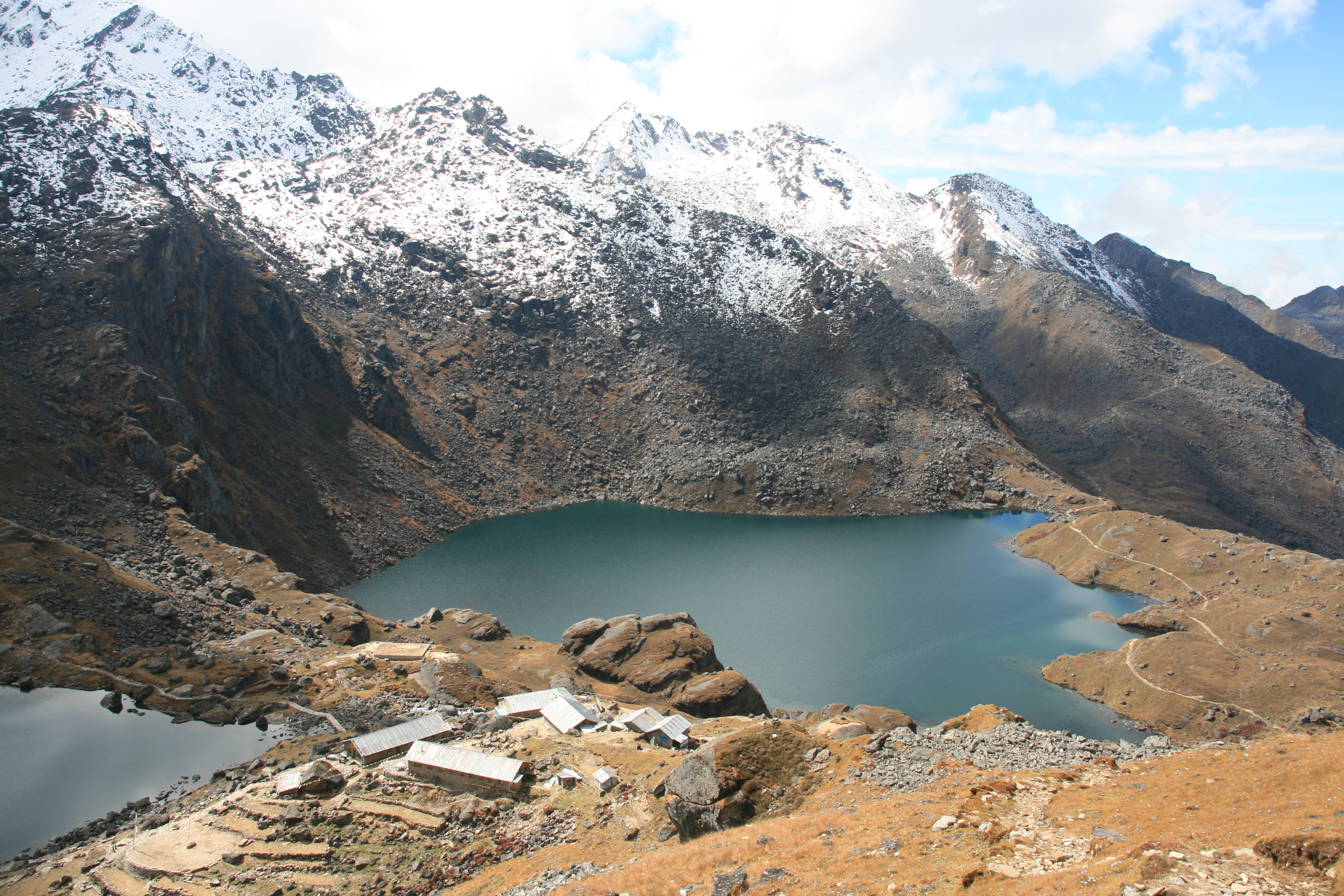
Gosaikunda Lake is an alpine freshwater oligotrophic lake in Nepal's Langtang National Park
