= Pasang: In the Shadow of Everest =

Biographical documentary on Pasang Lhamu Sherpa

- Directed by: Nancy Svendsen
- Written by: Sharon Wood, Adam Keker, Sari Gilman
- Produced by: Nancy Svendsen, Sharon Wood, Richard Levien, Christy McGill
- Starring: Pasang Lhamu Sherpa
- Cinematography: Martina Radwan
- Edited by: Jeffrey Friedman, Sari Gilman, Richard Levien
- Music by: Todd Boekelheide
- Production company: Follow Your Dream Foundation
- Release date: 2022
- Running time: 72 minutes
- Country: United States
- Languages: English, French, & Nepali
- Box office: $25,267.

Pasang: In the Shadow of Everest is a 2022 biographical documentary about Pasang Lhamu Sherpa, the first Nepali woman to summit Mount Everest on April 22, 1993. The film utilizes archival footage, interviews of people who knew Pasang, contemporary HD footage of Nepal and Everest, and motion graphics to explore Sherpa's pioneering achievements and the cultural and gender challenges she faced in the mountaineering community. It highlights her impact on Nepali society and her inspiration for future generations of Nepali women.

== Synopsis ==
Pasang: In the Shadow of Everest follows the life of Pasang Lhamu Sherpa and explores her determined journey against the backdrop of Nepal's male-dominated climbing culture, detailing the obstacles she overcame to achieve her dream. The documentary highlights Pasang Lhamu Sherpa's enduring legacy, which has been recognized as a source of inspiration for future generations of Nepali climbers, including Dawa Yangzum Sherpa and Pasang Lhamu Sherpa Akita.

== Cast ==
The main cast of *Pasang: In the Shadow of Everest includes:

- Pasang Lhamu Sherpa – Herself (Nepal's first woman to summit Mount Everest)
- Lhakpa Sonam Sherpa – Himself (husband of late Pasang Lhamu Sherpa, founder of Thamserku Expedition, and the first Nepalese to summit 7 summits.)
- Marc Batard – Himself (French mountaineer known as "The Sprinter")
- Norbu Tenzing – Himself (Son of Tenzing Norgay, Vice President of the American Himalayan Foundation)
- Vincanne Adams – Herself (Anthropologist and scholar specializing in Himalayan cultures. Author of Tigers of the Snow and Other Virtual Sherpas.)
- Jan Arnold – Herself (Everest summiteer, physician, and widow of mountaineer Rob Hall)
- Rudi Meier – Himself (Swiss mountaineer and guide)
- Jean Raphoz – Himself (Mountaineer and alpine guide)
- Mireille Schmitt – Herself (Pasang Lhamu's friend and Marc Batard's wife)
- Dawa Futi Sherpa – Herself (Pasang Lhamu's daughter)
- Ang Dorjee Sherpa – Himself (Pasang Lhamu's eldest brother)
- Lhakpa Geltzen Sherpa – Himself (Sherpa climber who accompanied Pasang Lhamu on her 1993 climb)
- Nawang Thiele Sherpa – Himself (Pasang Lhamu's younger brother)
- Pasang Yangjee Sherpa, PhD – Herself (A scholar of Sherpa culture and an academic researcher. Her expertise is documented in her review of Sherpa: Trouble on Everest, published in HIMALAYA.)
- Pemba Norbu Sherpa – Himself (Climber and guide)
- Phurna Kitar Sherpa – Himself (Pasang Lhamu's climbing partner)
- Raju Silwal – Himself (Nepalese journalist and Chief News Editor at Nepal News English)
- Pascal Tournaire – Himself (Photographer and mountaineer)
- Sir Edmund Hillary – Himself (archival footage)
- Tenzing Norgay (archive footage)

== Production ==
After learning about Pasang Lhamu Sherpa during a dinner conversation with her brother-in-law, Ang Dorjee Sherpa, Nancy Svendsen took an interest in producing a documentary to tell Pasang's story. The film took over 10 years to make, with Nancy Svendsen painstakingly working on combining photos and archival footage with interviews, and additional filming, editing, and motion graphics to illustrate the climbing expeditions on Mount Everest. Nancy's fundraising efforts began with the help of Executive Producer Alison Levine to complete the production. The fundraising campaigns initially referred to the film as The Glass Ceiling: The Untold Story of Pasang Lhamu Sherpa The fundraisers aimed to cover post-production costs such as the original music score, color correction, and sound effects. In 2011-2017, Svendsen raised over $160,000 from over 900 backers on Kickstarter and Indiegogo. Notable contributors included Dianne Feinstein, Arlene Blum, and several foundations such as Shelley and Donald Rubin Foundation, Silicon Valley Community Foundation, Stanton Family Foundation, John Rudolph Family Foundation, and William Simon Foundation. The funds raised helped record interviews with Pasang's family and mountaineers who knew her, hire a cinematographer to shoot scenes in Nepal and edit additional footage she had access to from Pasang Lhamu's funeral, covered on Nepali state television. The team also used footage from Rick Tejada Flores, who had interviewed Dorjee Sherpa in 1998 for a documentary about Pasang Lhamu that didn't come to fruition, and hired Academy Award winners Todd Boekelheide as the film's music composer, and Jeffrey Friedman as the editor to bring Pasang's story to life.

== Reception ==
Pasang: In the Shadow of Everest was an official selection at 45 film festivals across the United States and internationally between 2022 and 2024. The film made its World Premiere on March 3, 2022, at the 37th Annual Santa Barbara International Film Festival (Santa Barbara, CA).

The film was showcased at several prestigious film festivals, including the 24th Annual RiverRun International Film Festival (Winston-Salem, NC), 43rd Annual Mountainfilm Festival (Telluride, CO), 8th Annual Bentonville Film Festival (Bentonville, AR), 42nd Annual Kendal Mountain Film Festival (Kendal, England, UK), 46th Annual Banff Centre Mountain Film & Book Festival (Banff, Alberta, Canada), 71st Annual Trento Film Festival (Trento, Italy), the 35th Annual Virginia Film Festival (Charlottesville, VA), 25th Annual Vancouver International Mountain Film Festival (Vancouver, BC, Canada), the 19th Annual Boulder International Film Festival (Boulder, CO), and the 18th Annual Tasveer South Asian Film Festival (Seattle, WA), which is the only South Asian Film Festival to qualify for the Oscars.

In addition to these, Pasang was also screened at a wide range of other film festivals across North America, Europe, Asia, and beyond, highlighting its global appeal and relevance.

== Accolades ==
The film has garnered twenty-one awards including:

- Dhaka International Film Festival – 2024 Winner: Best Documentary Film
- Nepal America International Film Festival – 2023 Winner: Best Feature Documentary
- Trento Film Festival – 2023 Winner: Mario Bello Award
- New York WILD Film Festival|New York Wild Film Festival – 2023 Winner: Wild Spirit Award Best Feature
- Ulju Mountain Film Festival – 2023 Winner: Special Jury Prize
- BendFilm Festival – 2022 Winner: Audience Award
- Nevada City Film Festival – 2022 Winner: Audience Award
- Banff Mountain Film Competition – 2022 Winner: Festival Prize Best Feature Mountain Culture
- Middlebury New Filmmakers Festival – 3 Awards
  - 2022 Winner: Clio Visualizing History Prize for the Advancement of Women in Film
  - 2022 Winner: AICEF Prize for Cross-Cultural Filmmaking
  - 2022 Winner: Audience Award
- Bentonville Film Festival – 2022 Winner: Special Recognition Honorary Mention, Documentary Feature
- Festival International du Film Alpin des Diablerets – 2023 Winner: Diable d'Or Culture of the World Award
- Mountain Film Festival – 2022 Winner: Charlie Fowler Best Adventure Film Award
- Bilbao Mendi Film Festival – 2022 Winner: Best Culture & Nature Film
- Kendal Mountain Festival – 2022 Winner: Best Mountain
- Vancouver International Mountain Film Festival – 2023 Winner: Jury Prize Jury Special Mention
- Coast Film Festival – 2022 Winner: Best Spirit Award

== Release ==
The film's theatrical release screened in theaters in four countries: Nepal, Italy, Canada, and the United States.

Nepal Theatrical Premiere

To commemorate 30 years since Pasang's historic climb of the highest peak in the world, Pasang: In the Shadow of Everest premiered at QFX in Kathmandu, Nepal on April 19, 2023 with the Speaker of the House of Representatives, Dev Raj Ghimire, along with Dawa Yangzum Sherpa, and other representatives from embassies, UN offices, and NGOs in attendance. The premiere was a fundraiser for the Pasang Lhamu Foundation, which had translated the film into Nepalese to screen the film beyond Kathmandu Valley to Provinces 1 & 2 for students and women's organizations. The film screened for the public at QFX beginning April 28, and the film went on to screen in locations such as Lukla, Junbesi Monastery, Phaplu Community School, and Namche Bazaar, with the help of the US Embassy Nepal and the Kumbo Pasang Lhamu Rural Municipality. During the screening at Namche Bazaar, the event was attended by US Ambassador to Nepal Dean R. Thompson, as highlighted in the official gallery of the film *Pasang: In the Shadow of Everest*. The gallery includes a photo from this event dated April 30, 2023.

Italy Theatrical Premiere

The distributor in Italy, Mescalito Film, screened "Pasang: all'ombra dell'Everest" with Italian subtitles in over 45 cities in Italy between September 2023 and April 2024. The film premiered on September 7, 2023, and screened in the following Italian cities: Roma, Pisa, Bologna, Asti, Mantova, Trento, Cesena, Fano, Savignano sul Rubicone, Torino, Milano, Ascoli Piceno, Monza, Cremona, Treviglio, Trieste, Ancona, Padova, Matera, Foggia, Bra, L'aquila, Conegliano, Treviso, Manerbio, Rieti, Senigallia, Vittorio Veneto, Galbiate, Bergamo, Parma, Copadarco, Ferrara, Pesaro, Vincenza, La Spezia, Catania, Genova, Pascara, and Lombardia.

North American Theatrical Premiere

In the United States, theatrical distributor Lisa Hurwitz of Slice of Pie Productions, who had recently self-distributed her own film, The Automat, became the distributor of Pasang: In the Shadow of Everest for a short-run theatrical release in select theaters in the United States and Canada between January and June 2024.

Pasang: In the Shadow of Everest was one of 14 films released in theaters in the United States on Friday, January 19, 2024. Pasang: In the Shadow of Everest premiered in New York at Cinema Village for one week only and had the following special guests during different screening dates at times: Bishnu Prasad Gautam and Anup Khaple of Rest of World, Sanjeev M Sherchan of Asia Society New York, Preeti Adhikary of the Great Nepali Diaspora, President of the US Nepal Climbers Association, Prarthana Gurung of Adhikaar Center, Nepalese Actress Subeksha Khadka, Prava Adhikari of Himalayan Language and Culture Program NY, Er. Temba Sherpa of United Sherpa Association, and Suresh Shahi of Khasokhas Magazine, Journalist Prandeep Thapa of Nepalism, Angela Sherpa, President of Network of Sherpa Students and Professionals, and Pasang Doma Sherpa, Ms. Mongol Nepal 2022.

On January 19, the film also premiered in Vancouver, B.C. at the VIFF Film Center's First Look Friday Screening with special guest, Pasang Yangjee Sherpa, PhD, Anthropologist and Assistant Professor of First Nations & Endangered Languages Program at the University of British Columbia.

Following its premieres at the VIFF Center in Vancouver, Canada, and Cinema Village in New York, Pasang: In the Shadow of Everest was screened in various theaters across the US and Canada. The film was shown at notable venues including Laemmle Theaters in Los Angeles, the Regal Kaufman Astoria in Queens, NY, and the Hot Docs Ted Rogers Cinema in Toronto. The film's distribution included several other theaters such as Rosendale Theater in Rosendale, NY, Olympia Film Society - Olympia, WA, and SIFF - Seattle, WA.

Virtual Premiere

The worldwide virtual premiere of Pasang: In the Shadow of Everest occurred on May 29, (International Everest Day), 2024. The film was available on Eventive for one week, from May 29 to June 5, 2024. The premiere featured several special modules, including:

- Why Trailblazers Matter: A discussion moderated by journalist Lisa Ling, featuring Lehua Kamalu, who navigated a 3,000-mile Pacific voyage without maps or technology, Sarah Friar, CEO of Nextdoor (2012–2024) and now CFO of OpenAI, and JoAnn Ross, the first female executive at Paramount to become Chairman of Advertising
- Women on Everest Today: A conversation featuring Lex Limbu, founder of one of Nepal's most visited websites and a leading authority on the Nepali entertainment industry, who interviewed Dawa Futi Sherpa, and Dawa Yangzum Sherpa.
- Q&A with the Filmmakers: A discussion with Director, Nancy Svendsen, Executive Producers, Ang Dorjee Sherpa, and Dawa Futi Sherpa, and one of the film's interviewees, Norbu Tenzing (son of Tenzing Norgay), moderated by Preeti Adhikari, founder of the Great Nepali Diaspora.
- Never Before Seen Footage: Interviews with Alison Levine and Arlene Blum which did not make it into the final film.

Home media

The film was released on the digital streaming platform, Amazon Prime Video in the US and UK territories on July 29, 2024.

== Archival Significance ==
The script for Pasang: In the Shadow of Everest was donated to the Academy Foundation for placement in the prestigious Margaret Herrick Library. This donation signifies the film's cultural and historical importance, ensuring that the script will be preserved and accessible to researchers and filmmakers. The Margaret Herrick Library, managed by the Academy of Motion Picture Arts and Sciences, is known for its extensive collection of documents and materials related to the history of film.

== Critical Response ==
Rotten Tomatoes rates the documentary at 86%.

The following reviews for the film are mostly positive except for Ben Kenigsberg's mixed review in the New York Times.

- Golden Globe Awards - "Docs: The Remarkable and Untold Story of Pasang: In the Shadow of Everest"
- Alliance of Women Film Journalists - Movie of the Week January 12, 2024
- Film Threat - Pasang: In the Shadow of Everest
- Reel News Daily - Review: 'Pasang: In The Shadow of Everest' Showcases a National Hero with Tenacity to Spare
- The New York Times - "'Pasang: In the Shadow of Everest' Review: A Barrier-Breaking Ascent - This documentary tells the story of Pasang Lhamu Sherpa, the first Nepali woman to summit Earth's highest mountain."
- Video Librarian - Pasang: In the Shadow of Everest - 4.5 stars out of 5 stars

== See also ==
- Pasang Lhamu Sherpa
- Mount Everest
- Women in Nepal
- Feminism in Nepal
- Sherpa people
- Nepalis
