= Pasang Lhamu Sherpa Akita =

Nepali Sherpa mountaineer

Pasang Lhamu Sherpa Akita (born 1984) is a Nepali Sherpa mountaineer. She was the first woman in Nepal to become a mountaineering instructor, was one of the first Nepali women to reach the summit of K2, and has been active in earthquake relief in Nepal. In 2016, she was named National Geographic's People’s Choice Adventurer of the Year, and was presented with the 45th International Alpine Solidarity Award in Pinzolo, Italy.

== Climbs ==
Akita was the first woman to climb Nangpai Gosum II, in 2006. In 2007 she climbed Mount Everest, 14 years after another climber with the same name, Pasang Lhamu Sherpa, became the first Nepali woman to climb Everest but died in the descent.

Akita climbed K2 in 2014 as part of a three-woman team, the first team of Nepali women to climb the mountain. Climbing with Akita were Maya Sherpa and Dawa Yangzum Sherpa; they were part of a larger expedition that also included other (male) Sherpas and climbers. The climb was dedicated to climate change awareness, and took place on the 60th anniversary of the first ascent of K2.

She has also climbed Yala Peak, Ama Dablam, Lobuche, Imja Tse, and Aconcagua. As well as mountaineering in Nepal, she has guided mountaineering expeditions in the USA, Argentina, France, and Pakistan.

== Activism ==
Akita joined the Nomads Clinic, a medical service for remote regions of the Himalayas, in 2013. After the April 2015 Nepal earthquake, she worked in the relief efforts, distributing blankets, helping make shelters for people that the earthquake had left homeless, organizing temporary medical facilities, coordinating relief convoys, and preventing trafficking of victims. She is also developing a foundation to assist women's education in Nepal.

== Personal ==
Akita was born in Khumjung, and raised in Lukla. Her father died when she was young, and she and her younger sister were orphaned by the death of her mother when she was 15. They moved to Kathmandu, where she completed her high school studies and took a job as a mountaineer. Four years later, she entered training at Conrad Anker's Khumbu Climbing Center. She has also earned a diploma in mountaineering from the École nationale du ski et de l’alpinisme (ENSA) in Chamonix.

Her family owns a restaurant in Louisville, Colorado, where she has occasionally worked in between her mountaineering expeditions.

Her first name, Pasang, is the Nepali word for Friday, the day of her birth. She was given her full name after the earlier Pasang Lhamu Sherpa, the first Nepali woman to climb Everest, whom she takes as a role model. The surname Akita comes from her husband, a Nepali physical therapist of Japanese descent whom she met while recovering from a climbing hip injury and married in 2010.

== Awards ==
2016 - The George Mallory Award - Wasatch Mountain Film Festival
