= Badakhal =

Village in Jhapa District, Nepal

Badakhal (बडाखाल), is a village in Jhapa District, on the north side of Itabhatta, between Vhirkuti and Dokandada in Nepal. There is huge and beautiful 11 side football ground. It is the part of Mechinagar Municipality ward no.3. Previously, before Bahundangi VDC merged with Mechinagar Municipality, it was ward no.3 of Bahundangi Village Development Committee.
