= Itabhatta =

Itabhatta इटाभट्टा
- Itabhatta
- Location in Nepal
- Coordinates: 26°40′00″N 88°07′20″E
- Country: Nepal
- Province: Province No. 1
- District: Jhapa District
- Time zone: UTC+5:45 (Nepal Time)

Itabhatta, called Itabhatta Chowk locally, is a place in Jhapa District situated in Province No. 1 of Nepal. It is important part of Mechinagar Municipality because the municipality itself is located in Itabhatta. It lies between Dhulabari and Kakarvitta. Badakhal, Bhirkuti, Bahundangi are the villages located on the northern side of Itabhatta whereas Madanbasti, Gomansari are villages located at the southern side of Itabhatta.

== Transport ==
Mahendra Highway passes through Itabhatta. Itabhatta has gravel roads to link with villages located at northern and southern sides. Currently these roads are under construction and will be completed soon. Traffic from Dhulabari and Kakarbhitta passes through Itabhatta. Itabhatta has two bus stops, one for Dhulabari and next for Kakarbhitta.

== Demographics ==
At the time of the 1991 Nepal census, Mechinagar had a population of 21,366 people living in 4147 individual households. The major ethnicities living here are Brahmins, Chhettri, Rai, Limbu, Newar and Rajbanshi. Majority of people living here belong to Hindu religion.

== Geography ==
As like other nearby places, Itabhatta is situated in the plains at the base of the Himalaya mountains. Being at the eastern edge of country, nearest border to India is at a distance of 3.5 km.
