= Tsergo Ri landslide =

Prehistoric landslide in Nepal

The Tsergo Ri landslide was a prehistoric landslide in the Nepalese Himalaya, which took place around 51,000±13,000 years ago, during the Last Glacial Period. During the collapse, a mass of rock of about 10–15 cubic kilometres (2.4–3.6 cu mi) detached from a previous mountain or ridge and descended with a speed of about 450 kilometres per hour (120 m/s); later, glaciers eroded almost the entire landslide mass. Previously weakened rocks may have contributed to the collapse, which was probably started by an earthquake.

== Geomorphology and geology ==
The collapse of Tsergo Ri took place in Nepal's Langtang valley, perpendicular to the Himalaya and about 60 kilometres (37 mi) north of the Nepalese capital Kathmandu. The small settlement of Kyangjin Kharka lies at the foot of the landslide deposit. With a volume of 10–15 cubic kilometres (2.4–3.6 cu mi), it is one of the largest known mass movements on Earth and perhaps the largest known landslide in crystalline bedrock.

=== Causes and trigger ===
The collapse affected Himalayan gneiss rocks, which also contain migmatites and granites; they also include older pseudotachylite and ultramylonite rocks (both of which can be formed by collapses) and which acted as a sliding plane for the Tsergo Ri collapse. Rocks formed by deformation, intrusions of granite, and layers of pyrrhotite ore, which are unstable under mechanical load and neotectonic faults, may have been weak structures that facilitated the collapse.

The Tsergo Ri region is one of the fastest uplifting parts of the Himalaya. The Tsergo Ri landslide was probably triggered by seismic activity, perhaps on the Himalayan Main Central Thrust; a water level drop in the Paleo Kathmandu Lake took place at the same time and may have been caused by the same earthquake. The collapse occurred during a time of increased monsoon strength, which may have played a role in the collapse.

=== Pre-landslide topography and landslide ===
Based on reconstructions of the pre-landslide topography, there may have been a 7,500–8,500 metres (24,600–27,900 ft) high trilateral mountain in the area, or a set of ridges. The landslide detached in a southwest-west-southwest direction, with the sliding mass breaking apart into blocks. Owing to its fast speed of 450 kilometres per hour (120 m/s), rocks at the base of the slide melted. The landslide impacted other mountains and ridges, sometimes destroying them or triggering secondary collapses, and may have mixed with glacier ice.

It was eventually halted by topography such as the flanks of Pangshungtramo mountain before it could become a debris avalanche. The landslide debris consists of individual compact blocks on top of a basal breccia and originally may have reached a thickness of 600–800 metres (2,000–2,600 ft). Deformed structures inside the collapse debris indicate that small-scale movements occurred within the landslide. The slide obstructed several glacial valleys.

=== Timing and aftermath ===
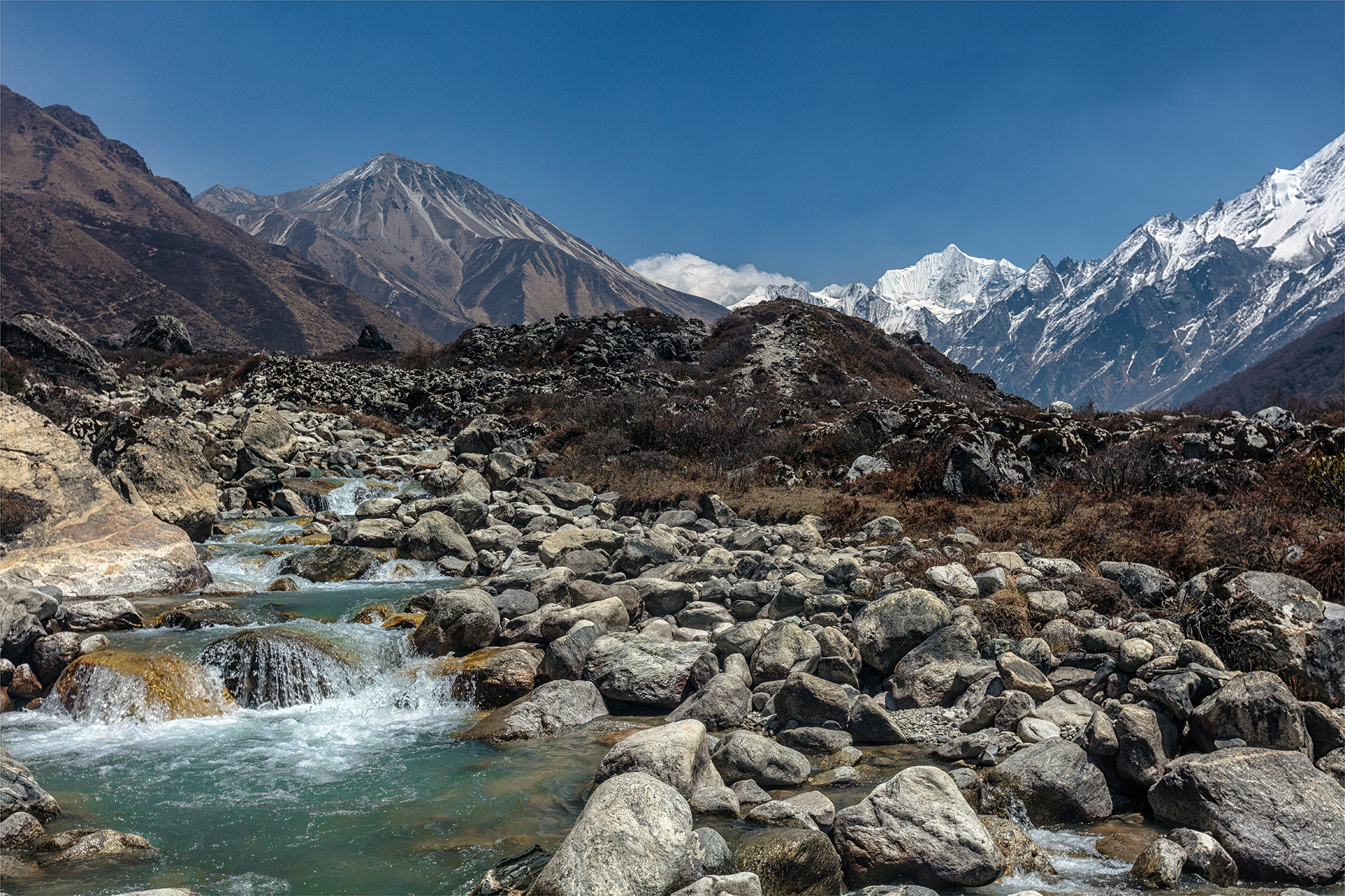
Tsergo Ri mountain (left), consisting of landslide debris

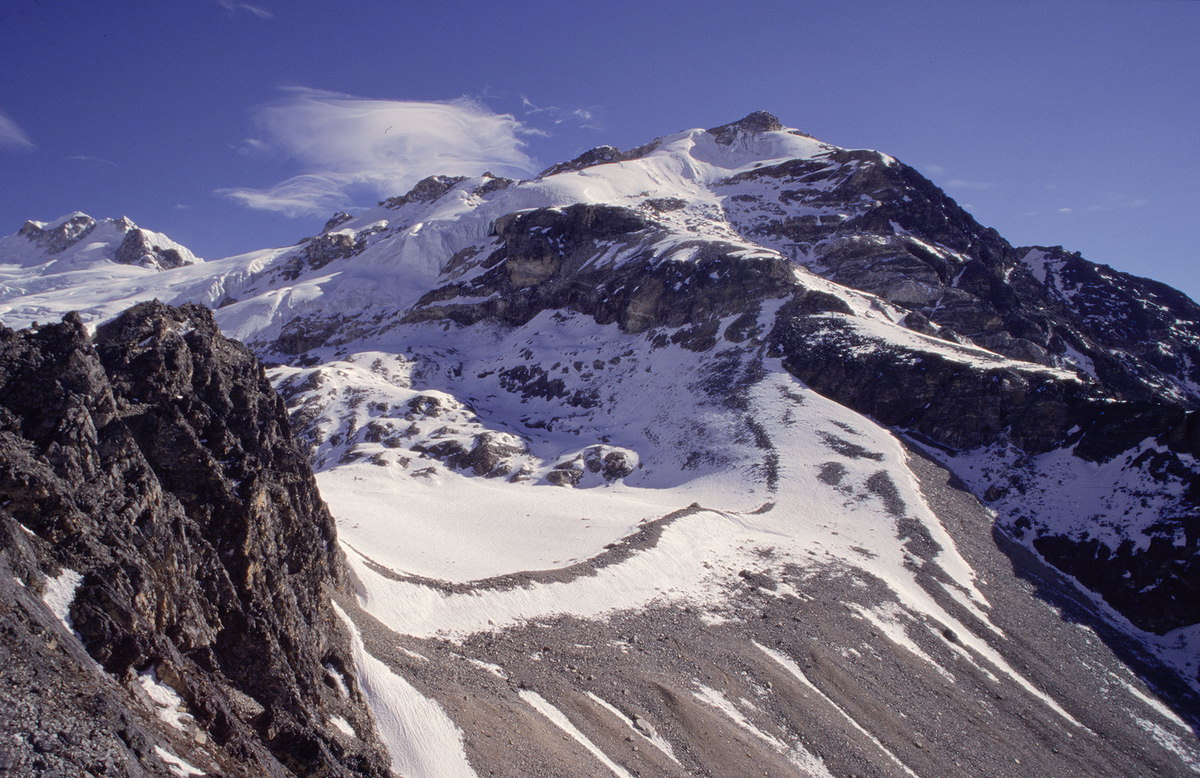
Yala Peak as a remainder of the detached rock mass

The collapse took place about 51,000±13,000 years ago, between two phases of the Last Glacial Period.

After the collapse, landslide debris was subject to glacial erosion and was largely removed in the process. About 3 cubic kilometres (0.72 cu mi) of debris is still present; it is found around Tsergo Ri mountain, which is formed by landslide debris and its location is in the central sector of the former landslide. Yala Peak and Dragpoche are in the area of the detachment, east of the seven-thousander Langtang Lirung. The glaciers that had had their valleys cut by the landslide readvanced during the youngest phase of the Last Glacial Period and partially restored the valleys. Landslides take place to this day in the area, including during the 2015 Nepal earthquake when a landslide detached from Langtang Lirung peak and killed over 350 people in the Langtang valley. Slow mass movements into valleys and weather/monsoon-controlled mudflows also occur, and there is evidence that the debris from the Tsergo Ri landslide is especially unstable.

== Research history ==
Molten rocks formed during the collapse were initially referred to by native people as "yak bones", while early researchers interpreted the rocks as a product of the Himalayan Main Central Thrust fault. In 1984 Heuberger et al. identified their actual origin in a giant landslide. The structure of the landslide body has been mapped using radon emissions and groundwater flows, and the most recent date estimates were obtained with fission track dating on pseudotachylites formed by the collapse.
