= Dawa Yangzum Sherpa =

Nepali mountaineer guide

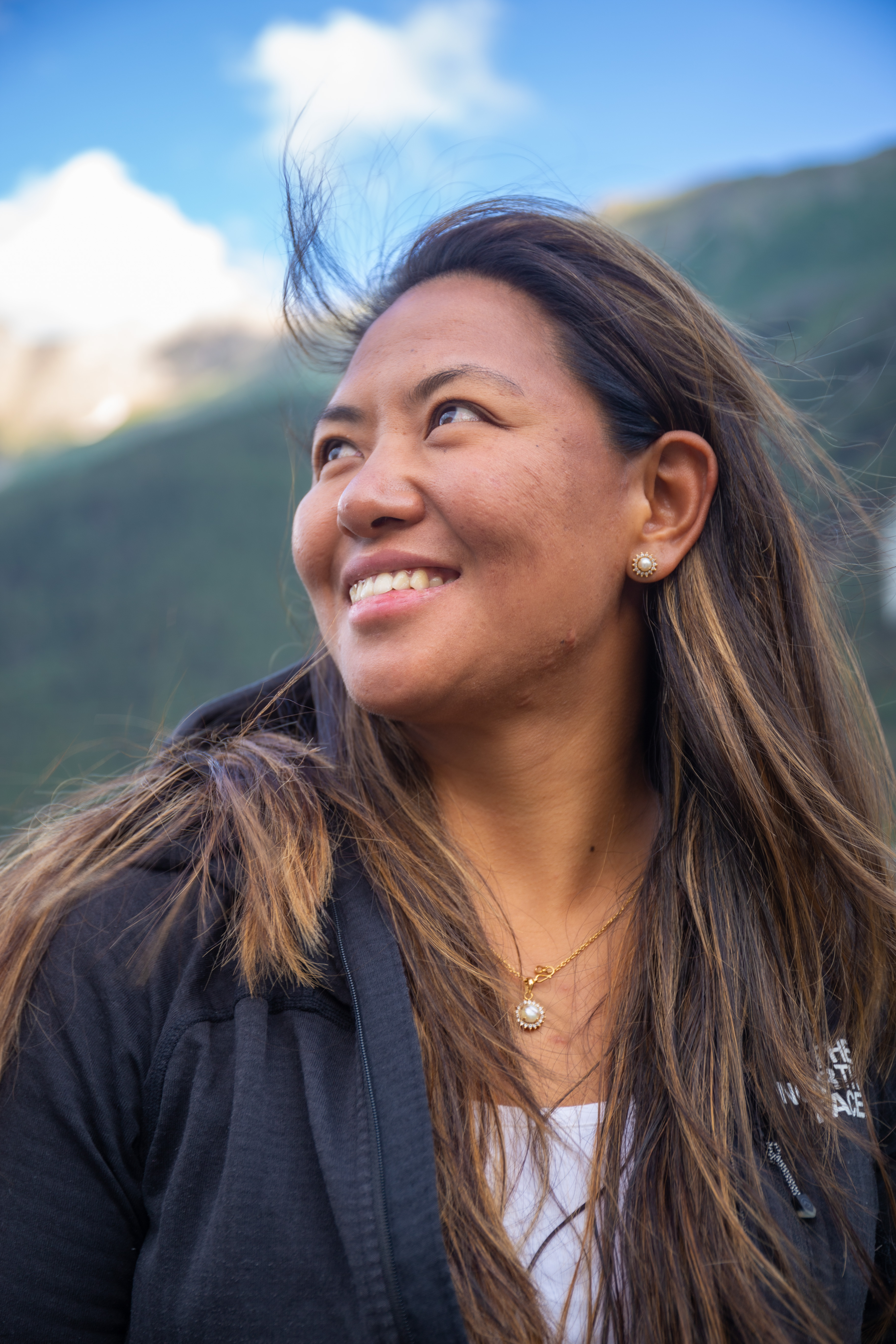
- Born: 1990 (age 35–36); Nā, Dolakha, Nepal
- Other names: DaYangzum Sherpa
- Occupation: Mountain guide
- Employer: Alpine Ascents International
- Known for: Mountain guide, first Nepalese woman to summit all 14 eight-thousanders
- Spouse: Mingma Tenzi Sherpa
- Children: Tashi Yangzum Sherpa
- Website: https://dawayangzumsherpa.com/

Dawa Yangzum Sherpa, also known as Dawa Yangzum, is a Nepalese mountaineer and the first woman to become an international mountain guide from Nepal. In October 2024, she became the first Nepalese woman to summit all 14 eight-thousanders.

== Life ==
Dawa Yangzum started her professional mountain climbing in 2009 with Yala Peak marking her first summit. She became one of the iconic Nepali mountain climbers in the history after climbing Mount Everest in 2012. In 2017, she received a certification from the International Federation of Mountain Guides Association and qualified to become an international mountain guide in the same year. In March 2019, she signed a professional agreement with a US outdoor recreation product company, making her one of the few professional Nepali mountaineers to be paid as an athlete by a major western company.

Dawa Yangzum has climbed Everest several times and she became the first female Nepali woman to summit the fifth highest peak Makalu on 29 May 2019. On 26 July 2014, she was part of the all female 3-member Nepali contingent to summit K2. The other prominent members were Pasang Lhamu Sherpa Akita and Maya Sherpa. She also became the first woman to reach the true summit of Manaslu in autumn 2021.

On 9 October 2024, Sherpa summitted Shishapangma, her final eight-thousander. With this climb, she became the first Nepalese woman to summit all 14 of the eight-thousanders.
