= Alison Levine =

Alison Levine may refer to:

- Alison Levine (mountain climber), American mountain climber
- Alison Levine (boccia), Canadian boccia player
