= Pasang Lhamu Sherpa =

Nepali mountaineer (1961–1993)

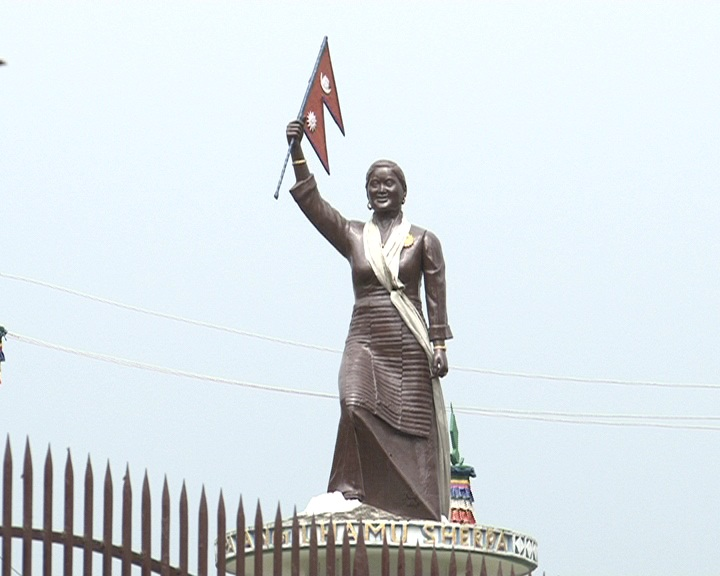
- Statue of Pasang Lhamu Sherpa in Kathmandu

Personal information
- Native name: པ་སངས་ལྷ་མོ་ཤར་པ། पासाङ ल्हामु शेर्पा
- Nationality: Nepali
- Born: 10 December 1961 Surke, Solukhumbu District, Nepal
- Died: 22 April 1993 (aged 31) Mount Everest, Nepal
- Occupations: Mountaineer, trekking guide
- Spouse: Lhakpa Sonam Sherpa
- Children: Dawa Futi Sherpa, Diki Sherpa and Namgyal Sherpa

Climbing career
- Type of climber: Mountaineering
- Major ascents: First Nepali woman to summit Mount Everest (1993)

Pasang Lhamu Sherpa (Sherpa: པ་སངས་ལྷ་མོ་ཤར་པ།; Nepali: पासाङ ल्हामु शेर्पा; 10 December 1961 – 22 April 1993) was a Nepali mountaineer and trekking guide who became the first Nepali woman to reach the summit of Mount Everest. She reached the summit on 22 April 1993 by the South Col and Southeast Ridge, but died during the descent. Her achievement made her a prominent national figure in Nepal. She was posthumously awarded the Nepal Tara (Star of Nepal), and was later recognised by the Government of Nepal as a National Luminary.

== Early life ==
Pasang Lhamu Sherpa was born in Solukhumbu District into a mountaineering family. The Pasang Lhamu Mountaineering Foundation identifies her birthplace as Surke, in what is now Ward No. 2 of Khumbu Pasanglhamu Rural Municipality. Other biographies have described her birthplace more broadly as Lukla or the Lukla area. ECS Nepal gives her date of birth as 10 December 1961, while a later Nepal News biography gives 16 December 1961. Her father, Phurba Kitar Sherpa, was involved in mountaineering, and Pasang began accompanying him on treks while she was a teenager. She subsequently worked as a trekking guide. She married Lhakpa Sonam Sherpa, who operated a trekking agency in Kathmandu. The couple had three children: daughters Dawa Futi Sherpa and Diki Sherpa, and a son, Namgyal Sherpa. Dawa Futi later became president of the Pasang Lhamu Foundation.

== Climbing career ==
Pasang Lhamu became involved in climbing from her teenage years. In 1987 she climbed Pisang Peak and Yala Peak, and in 1990 she climbed Mont Blanc in France. Biographical accounts also credit her with an ascent of Cho Oyu. She attempted Mount Everest three times before her successful ascent. Her previous attempts took place in 1990, 1991 and 1992. In 1991 she climbed as part of an expedition led by French mountaineer Marc Batard, but did not reach the summit. In 1992 she led another Everest expedition and made two summit attempts, reaching the South Summit on one before turning back because of strong winds.

=== 1993 Everest expedition ===
In 1993, Pasang Lhamu and her husband organised the Nepalese Women's Sagarmatha Expedition with the aim of putting the first Nepali woman on the summit of Everest. Shortly after midnight on 22 April, Pasang Lhamu left the South Col for the summit. The contemporary account by mountaineering chronicler Elizabeth Hawley in the American Alpine Journal lists the party as Pasang Lhamu, Sonam Tshering Sherpa, Dawa Tashi Sherpa, Lhakpa Nuru Sherpa, Pemba Nuru Sherpa and Nawang Thile Sherpa. An American Alpine Club summary likewise records all six as having reached the summit that day. The Pasang Lhamu Mountaineering Foundation gives a partly different list, naming Sonam Tshering Sherpa, Lhakpa Noru Sherpa, Pemba Dorje Sherpa and Dawa Tashi Sherpa among the climbers accompanying her. The published accounts therefore differ over some members of the summit party. The climb followed the South Col and Southeast Ridge route. Pasang Lhamu reached the summit on the afternoon of 22 April, becoming the first Nepali woman to stand on the summit of Mount Everest. During the descent, Sonam Tshering Sherpa, who was completing his fifth Everest ascent, became gravely ill near the South Summit and began coughing blood. Pasang Lhamu and Pemba Nuru remained with him while other members of the team descended. Their supplemental oxygen was exhausted during an unprepared bivouac at extreme altitude. The following morning, according to Hawley's account, Sonam Tshering was unable to stand and Pasang Lhamu became severely dizzy when attempting to rise. Pemba Nuru descended to the South Col to seek oxygen and assistance. A rescue attempt was subsequently prevented by severe winds. Pasang Lhamu did not survive. Although 22 April 1993 is conventionally given as her date of death, Hawley's contemporary account states that Pemba Nuru last saw her alive on the morning of 23 April. Her body was not reached until 10 May, when climbers found it near the South Summit. Sonam Tshering's body was not found. Contemporary and later accounts describe deteriorating weather, lack of supplemental oxygen, exhaustion and exposure as central circumstances of the tragedy. Lithuanian mountaineer Vladas Vitkauskas, who reached the summit of Everest on 10 May 1993, later took part in the operation to transport Pasang Lhamu's body down the mountain.

== Honours and legacy ==
Pasang Lhamu was extensively commemorated in Nepal after her death. She became the first woman to receive the Nepal Tara (Star of Nepal) from the King of Nepal. The National Youth Foundation also conferred its 1993–94 Youth Excellence Award on her. A life-size statue of her was erected at Chuchepati in the Boudha area of Kathmandu, and Nepal issued a postage stamp in her honour. The Government of Nepal later recognised her as a National Luminary. Jasamba Himal, also known as Nangpai Gosum I, in the Mahalangur Himal, was officially renamed Pasang Lhamu Chuli by the Government of Nepal after her death. The American Alpine Club lists the summit at 7,352 metres (24,121 ft), while the Pasang Lhamu Mountaineering Foundation gives a height of 7,315 metres (23,999 ft). The Ministry of Agriculture named a wheat cultivar Pasang Lhamu in her honour. Agricultural records show that the Pasang Lhamu wheat cultivar, pedigree PGO/SERI, was released in Nepal in 1997 for cultivation in the hills. The Pasang Lhamu Memorial Hall was established in Dhulabari, Jhapa District, and the 117 km Trishuli–Dhunche road was named the Pasang Lhamu Highway in her honour. The Pasang Lhamu Mountaineering Foundation was established in 1993 in her memory. Its activities have included programmes in education, health, skills development, support for mountaineers and the empowerment of women and children in Nepal's mountain regions.

== Biographical documentary ==
In 2022, a biographical documentary, Pasang: In the Shadow of Everest, was released about her life, mountaineering career and legacy. The film was directed and produced by Nancy Svendsen. Alison Levine was among its executive producers. Svendsen and the production team developed the project over roughly a decade. The documentary recounts Pasang Lhamu's efforts to become the first Nepali woman to summit Everest, placing her expeditions in the context of gender inequality, Sherpa identity and Nepal's political changes. The film had its world premiere at the Santa Barbara International Film Festival on 3 March 2022, with additional screenings there on 4, 5 and 12 March. It received positive reviews from critics, including Film Threat and the Alliance of Women Film Journalists. It also received audience awards at festivals including the Nevada City Film Festival, BendFilm Festival and Middlebury New Filmmakers Festival. By 2024, the film had screened at 45 film festivals worldwide and had won 20 awards.

== Lhamu lunar crater ==
In 2024, the International Astronomical Union's Working Group for Planetary System Nomenclature adopted the name Lhamu for a crater near the lunar south pole in honour of Pasang Lhamu Sherpa. The name was approved by the IAU on 29 July 2024. The crater has a diameter of approximately 1.40 kilometres (0.87 mi) and is centred at 85.92° south latitude and 1.62° west longitude. The official Gazetteer of Planetary Nomenclature, maintained by the United States Geological Survey, states that the crater was named for Pasang Lhamu as the first Nepali woman to climb Mount Everest. Following the announcement, the Embassy of Nepal in Washington, D.C., said the naming recognised her legacy and noted that her Everest achievement had opened opportunities for Nepali women and inspired women internationally.

== See also ==
- List of climbers
- List of Mount Everest records
- List of 20th-century summiters of Mount Everest
- Shriya Shah-Klorfine, a Nepal-born woman who also died during an Everest descent, in 2012
- Lhakpa Sherpa, a Nepali-born mountaineer who has summited Everest ten times
