= Mechinagar Municipality =

Municipality in Koshi Province, Nepal

Mechinagar मेचीनगर
- Municipality (नगरपालिका)
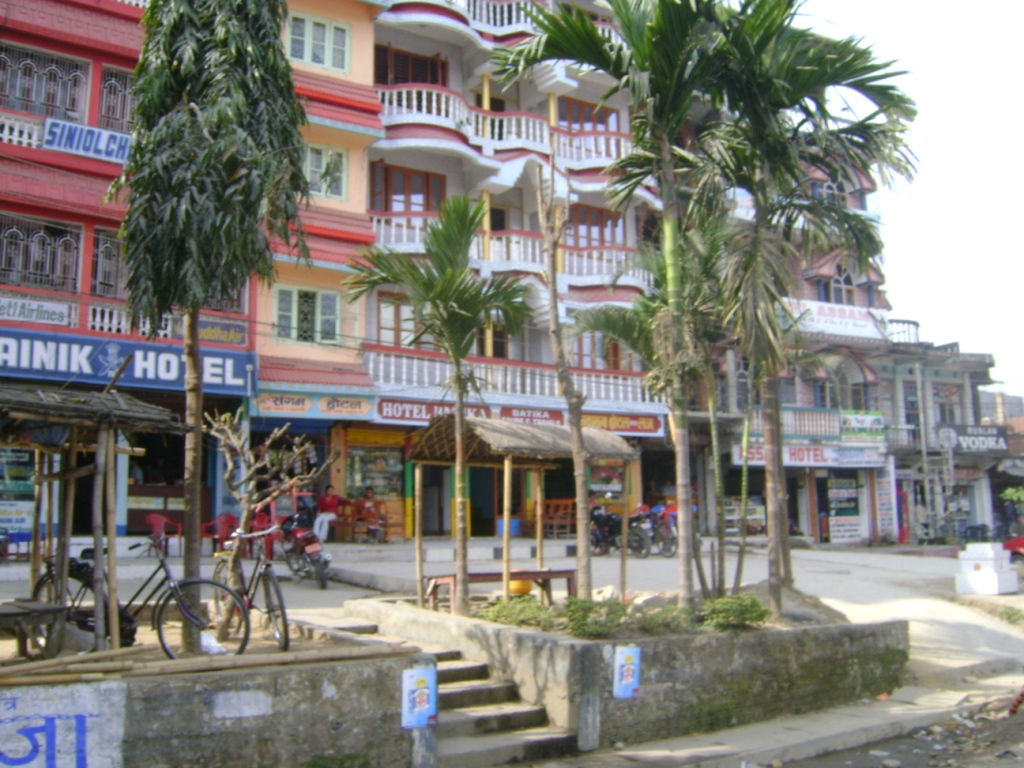
- Motto: To develop local area.
- Location in Koshi Province Mechinagar (Nepal)
- Coordinates: 26°40′00″N 88°07′20″E
- Country: Nepal
- Province: Koshi Province
- District: Jhapa District

Government
  - Mayor (2022-2027): Gopal Chandra Budhathoki(NCP)
  - Deputy Mayor: Mina Upreti (NCP)
  - Chief District Officer: Bishwanath Baral

Population (2021)
  - Total: 131,520
  - Rank: 4th (Province No. 1); 26th (Nepal)
- Time zone: UTC+5:45 (NST)
- Postal code: 57207, 57208
- Area code: 023
- Website: mechinagarmun.gov.np

Mechinagar (Nepali: मेचीनगर) is a municipality in Jhapa District, Koshi Province, Nepal and is the main entry point from India on Nepal's eastern border. Nepal's customs office is in Kakarvitta (Nepali: काँकडभिट्टा), a section of the municipality. The city lies 475 km southeast of the capital Kathmandu and 115 km east of Biratnagar, the capital of Koshi Province.

== Origin ==
Mechinagar Municipality initially originated by combining Dhulabari (Nepali: धुलाबारी) and Kakarbhitta Village Development Committee. The municipality got its first territorial expansion by merging with nearby VDCs Bahundangi, Duhagadhi, Jyamirgadhi and Dhaijan in 2073 BS (2017 AD). The population of the expanded city is 131,520 (as of the 2021 census), and its area is 192.52 sq. km. It is the municipality with the highest population in the country. Kakarbhitta used to be the hub of betel nut trade in Nepal. There is still a street named ‘Supari (betel nut) Lane’ in Kakarbhitta.

== Geographical status ==
The city lies in eastern Nepal. The city is the largest municipality in the Jhapa District. The city has Arjundhara Municipality and Birtamod in the Western Part, Buddha Shanti Gaupalika and Ilam District in the North, Bhadrapur, Mechi in the south and West Bengal, India in the east. Mechi River separates the City and Nepal from India.

Two major highways, Mahendra Highway & Mechi Highway, run in the city. The city is the link between the Northern Mechi Zone for the rest of the nation. The nearest airport is Bhadrapur Airport, which is just attached to the southern part of the city. Daily 6-8 flights make it to Kathmandu two ways from the airport.

== Ward Division ==
Previously, the city was divided into 13 wards. The city was divided into 15 wards after expansion. The following are the new ward divisions:

| Ward No | Previously | Area (km^{2}) | Population (2011) | Density (per km^{2}) |
| 1 | Bahundangi 7,8 & 9 | 13.10 | 5,793 | 442 |
| 2 | Bahundangi 4 & 6 | 13.50 | 5,877 | 435 |
| 3 | Bahundangi 3 & 5 | 18.50 | 7,102 | 384 |
| 4 | Bahundangi 1 & 2 | 12.40 | 5,050 | 407 |
| 5 | Mechinagar 8 & 9 | 9.17 | 4,533 | 494 |
| 6 | Mechinagar 10 | 4.43 | 14,289 | 3,226 |
| 7 | Mechinagar 11 & 12 and Jymargadi 8 & 9 | 16.21 | 10,904 | 673 |
| 8 | Mechinagar 7 & 13 | 12.10 | 6,527 | 539 |
| 9 | Mechinagar 4,5 & 6 | 13.50 | 10,162 | 753 |
| 10 | Mechinagar 1,2 & 3 | 8.05 | 13,588 | 1,688 |
| 11 | Dhaijan 1, 2, 7, 8 & 9 | 9.55 | 5,507 | 577 |
| 12 | Dhaijan 3, 4, 5 & 6 | 7.01 | 4,313 | 615 |
| 13 | Duwagadi 2, 3, 4 & 5 | 12.30 | 5,594 | 455 |
| 14 | Duwagadi 1, 6, 7, 8 & 9 | 19.10 | 5,103 | 267 |
| 15 | Jymargadi 1,2,3,4,5,6 & 7 | 23.60 | 7,395 | 313 |

== Local Election ==
=== Local Level Election 2017 ===
Mechinagar Municipality is in the Jhapa district of Pradesh 1. There are 90,202 eligible voters for the Nepal local elections 2017, according to the Election Commission. There are 15 wards in the metropolitan city with a population of 111,520.

- Total Population: 111,520
- Number of Wards: 15
- Election Center: 35
- Number of Male Voters: 45,112
- Number of Female Voters: 45,090
- Number of Other Voters: -
- Total Eligible Voters: 90,202

=== Mayoral election ===
Summary of Mechinagar mayoral election, 2017
| Party | Candidate | Votes | % |
|---|---|---|---|
| Nepali Congress | Bimal Acharya | 20,776 | 41.61% |
| CPN (Unified Marxist–Leninist) | Bishnu Prasad Prasain | 19,192 | 38.79% |
| Communist Party of Nepal (Maoist Centre) | Hand Lal Rajbanshi | 7,696 | 4.61% |
| Rastriya Prajatantra Party | Ramesh Dahal | 803 | 0.72% |
| Others | | 1246 | 14.27% |
| Total | | 49,711 | 100 |
| Result | | Nepali Congress gain | |

Summary of Mechinagar deputy mayoral election, 2017
| Party | Candidate | Votes | % |
|---|---|---|---|
| CPN (Unified Marxist–Leninist) | Mina Kumari Pokharel | 20,016 | 40.42% |
| Nepali Congress | Durga Khatiwada | 19,106 | 38.59% |
| Communist Party of Nepal (Maoist Centre) | Indira karki | 7,690 | 4.56% |
| Rastriya Prajatantra Party | Sabina Bajagain | 1,235 | 1.89% |
| Others | | 1246 | 14.54% |
| Total | | 49,711 | 100 |
| Result | | CPN (UML) gain | |

=== Local Level Election 2079 ===
Mechinagar Municipality is in the Jhapa district of Pradesh 1. There are 90,202 eligible voters for the Nepal local elections 2022, according to the Election Commission. There are 15 wards in the metropolitan city with a population of 131,520.

- Total Population : 131,520
- Number of Wards : 15
- Election Center : 35
- Number of Male Voters : 45,112
- Number of Female Voters : 45,090
- Number of Other Voters : -
- Total Eligible Voters : 90,202

List Of Table
| Party | Mayor | Deputy Mayor | Results |
|---|---|---|---|
| Nepali Congress | Indra Bahadur Budhathoki | - | |
| CPN (Unified Marxist–Leninist) | Gopal Chandra Budhathoki | Mina Kumari Pokharel | |
| Communist Party of Nepal (Maoist Centre) | - | Prakash Bhandari | |
| Mangol National Organization | Kishore Dhimal | Shikha Limbu | |
| Rastriya Prajatantra Party | Ramesh Dahal | Sabina Bajgain | |
| Loktantrit Samajwadi Party | Lawan Singh Dhimal | Anita Murmu | |
| Maulik Jarokilo Party | Hira Bastola | Sita Dulal | |
| CPN (Maxist Leninist) | Bharisadas Poudel | - | |
| CPN (Unified Socialist) | - | Sharada Sharma Ghimire | |
| Independents | Ram Kumar Budhathoki | | |
| Independents | Bijay Kumar Adhikari | | |
| Independents | | Dilli Ram Ghimire | |

== Council formation ==
Representation of Mechinagar Council Members
1. Communist Party of Nepal (Unified Marxist–Leninist) (72.0%)
2. (Nepali Congress) (19.0%)
3. CPN (Maoist Centre) (9.00%)

| Party | Mayor | Deputy Mayor | Ward Chairman | Ward Members | Total seats | Remarks |
|---|---|---|---|---|---|---|
| Communist Party of Nepal (UML) | 1 | 1 | 11 | 55 | 28 | ' ' ' Majority' ' ' |
| Nepali Congress | | | 3 | 5 | 8 | |
| CPN(Maoist Centre) | | | 1 | 0 | 1 | |
| Total | 1 | 1 | 15 | 60 | 77 | 42 for Majority |

== Current members ==
| Ward no. | Category | Members | Party |
Ward chairman (15)
| 1 | Ward Chairman | Raj Kumar Rai | CPN (Unified Marxist–Leninist) |
| 2 | Ward Chairman | Deepak Baral | CPN (Unified Marxist–Leninist) |
| 3 | Ward Chairman | Harka Basnet | CPN (Unified Marxist–Leninist) |
| 4 | Ward Chairman | Arjun Kumar Karki | CPN (Unified Marxist–Leninist) |
| 5 | Ward Chairman | Kanak Karki | CPN (Unified Marxist–Leninist) |
| 6 | Ward Chairman | Lalit Bahadur Tamang | Nepali Congress |
| 7 | Ward Chairman | | CPN (Unified Marxist–Leninist) |
| 8 | Ward Chairman | Giriraj Dhamala | Nepali Congress |
| 9 | Ward Chairman | | CPN (Unified Marxist–Leninist) |
| 10 | Ward Chairman | Narayan Khanal | CPN (Unified Marxist–Leninist) |
| 11 | Ward Chairman | | CPN (Unified Marxist–Leninist) |
| 12 | Ward Chairman | | CPN (Unified Marxist–Leninist) |
| 13 | Ward Chairman | | CPN (Unified Marxist–Leninist) |
| 14 | Ward Chairman | | Communist Party of Nepal (Maoist Centre) |
| 15 | Ward Chairman | | Nepali Congress |

== Demographics ==
At the time of the 2011 Nepal census, Mechinagar Municipality had a population of 112,997. Of these, 63.5% spoke Nepali, 8.7% Rajbanshi, 3.6% Limbu, 3.5% Maithili, 2.6% Rai, 2.6% Tamang, 1.8% Mech, 1.8% Newar, 1.5% Santali, 1.4% Magar, 1.2% Dhimal, 0.8% Rajasthani, 0.8% Urdu, 0.7% Kisan, 0.7% Tharu, 0.6% Gurung, 0.4% Bengali, 0.4% Bhojpuri, 0.4% Danwar, 0.4% Hindi, 0.4% Uranw/Urau, 0.3% Bantawa, 0.3% Sherpa, 0.2% Chamling, 0.1% Dungmali, 0.1% Kharia, 0.1% Kulung, 0.1% Majhi, 0.1% Malpande, 0.1% Musalman, 0.1% Sunwar and 0.4% other languages as their first language.

In terms of ethnicity/caste, 22.3% were Hill Brahmin, 18.6% Chhetri, 8.9% Rajbanshi, 5.1% Rai, 4.7% Limbu, 4.4% Newar, 4.3% Tamang, 3.9% Magar, 3.5% Kami, 2.0% Damai/Dholi, 1.9% Mech, 1.9% Sanyasi/Dasnami, 1.3% Dhimal, 1.3% Musalman, 1.3% Santal, 1.1% Tharu, 1.0% Gharti/Bhujel, 1.0% Gurung, 1.0% Marwadi, 0.8% Kisan, 0.8% Sarki, 0.7% Danuwar, 0.7% other Terai, 0.6% Jhangad/Dhagar, 0.5% Kathabaniyan, 0.4% Sherpa, 0.3% Bengali, 0.3% Majhi, 0.3% Munda, 0.3% Sunuwar, 0.3% Teli, 0.3% Yadav, 0.2% Terai Brahmin, 0.2% other Dalit, 0.2% Dhanuk, 0.2% Hajjam/Thakur, 0.2% other Janajati, 0.2% Kalwar, 0.2% Mallaha, 0.1% Bantawa, 0.1% Bantar/Sardar, 0.1% Chamling, 0.1% Dhobi, 0.1% Dom, 0.1% Halwai, 0.1% Kanu, 0.1% Kayastha, 0.1% Kewat, 0.1% Khawas, 0.1% Kulung, 0.1% Kumal, 0.1% Musahar, 0.1% Pattharkatta/Kushwadiya, 0.1% Rajput, 0.1% Samgpang, 0.1% Sonar, 0.1% Sudhi, 0.1% Thakuri, 0.1% Thami, 0.1% Yakkha and 0.4% others.

In terms of religion, 81.9% were Hindu, 6.4% Buddhist, 6.1% Kirati, 2.5% Christian, 1.2% Muslim, 1.2% Prakriti, 0.2% Jain and 0.5% others.

In terms of literacy, 77.0% could read and write, 1.4% could only read and 21.6% could neither read nor write.

== Climate ==
The city temperature reaches up to 40 degree Celsius in the summer and falls below 8 degrees in the winter. The city is a summer city and the winter lasts only for four months (November to February). During March and April, high winds are likely to occur and moderate rainfall is seen in June and July.

== Road Network ==
- Asian Highway 02 (AH02)
- Mahendra Highway (H01)
- Mechi Highway (H07)
- Bahundangi Road
