= Vladas Vitkauskas =

Lithuanian mountaineer (born 1953)

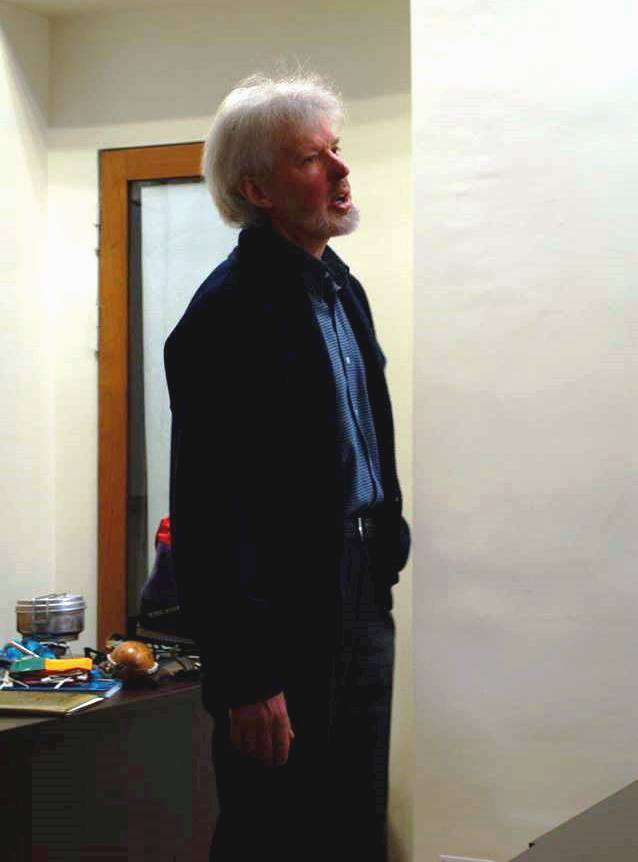
- Vladas Vitkauskas in 2014
- Born: 7 May 1953 (age 73); Viduklė, Raseiniai district, Lithuania
- Education: Kaunas University of Technology (Diplôme d'Ingénieur)
- Occupation: Mountaineer

Vladas Vitkauskas (born 7 May 1953 in Viduklė, Raseiniai district in Lithuania) is a mountaineer who became the first Lithuanian to climb the world's highest mountain, Mount Everest, in 1993.

== Early life ==
Vitkauskas graduated from Viduklė Middle School in 1970 (now called Viduklė Simonas Stanevičius Gymnasium). From 1970 to 1975, he studied microelectronics at Kaunas University of Technology and received his degree in electronic engineering.

== Expeditions ==
Between 1989 and 1990, Vitkauskas climbed the Snow Leopard peaks during the reign of the Soviet Union.

Between 1993 and 1996 Vitkauskas also climbed the Seven Summits, and was the first to raise the Lithuanian flag on each of them.

In 1997, he became the first mountain climber to be awarded the diploma of honour of the International Fair Play Committee for participating in the rescue of the body of Pasang Lhamu, the leader of the Nepalese Women Everest Expedition (1993) from Mount Everest.

== Personal life ==
Vitkauskas is the founder and first president of the Lithuanian Mountaineering Association (1996–1999); founder and chairman of the Everest Foundation, head of the Naturavita health centre; a member of the Lithuanian National Olympic Committee, member of the advisory board of the magazine Santara.

== Awards ==
- International Fair Play Committee diploma of honour (1997).
- Medals of the Ministry of Culture and Department of Physical Culture and Sports at the government of the Republic of Lithuania: “For High Sports Achievements” (1993), “For Merits to Lithuanian Sports” (1993, 1998), the gold medal “For merits to Lithuanian sports” (2003).
- Medal of the First Class Order of the Lithuanian Grand Duke Gediminas(1994).
- Olympic Star of the Lithuanian National Olympic Committee (2003).
- Order of Concord “Pro augenda concordia” (2009).

== Literature ==
- Everestas’94. 1994 metų kalendorius. Vilnius, Du Ka, 1993. – Liet., angl.
- Aukščiau pasaulio viršukalnių / Above the Peaks of the World. Vilnius, DuKa, 1998. – Liet., angl.
- Everestas – manoji lemtis. Vilnius, Vilniaus universiteto leidykla, 2002.
- My Mountain, My Destiny // P. Cousineau. Soul moments. Berkeley, USA, Conari Press, 1997.
- Apie savo keliones. // K. Švedas. Geografinių atradimų istorija. Vilnius, Švietimo ir mokslo ministerijos leidybos centras, 1997.
- Į aukščiausias visų žemynų viršukalnes. // R. Krupickas ir Č. Kudaba. Kaunas, “Šviesa”, 2000.
- G. Motuza – bendraaut. Ignoto Domeikos keliais nuo Santjago iki Atakamos. // Ignotas Domeika 1802 – 1889: tarptautinės mokslinės konferencijos darbai. Vilnius, 2002. – Liet., angl.
- Su Gražina Didelyte suvedė kalnai... // Gražina Didelytė mūsų atminty. Sudarytojas Vygandas Čaplikas. Vilnius, Petro ofsetas, 2008.
- Fotografijos. // Stanislovas Moravskis. Nuo Merkinės iki Kauno. Parengė Reda Griškaitė. Vilnius, Vilniaus dailės akademijos leidykla. 2009.
- Į aukščiausias žemės viršukalnes. // Kalnams pašaukus. Sudarytojas V. Stepulis. Vilnius, 2011.

== Sources ==
- http://www.bernardinai.lt/straipsnis/2012-01-30-vladas-vitkauskas-gyvenimo-kelias-vede-per-kalnus/76112
