= Dhaijan =

Dhaijan धाइजन
- Village development committee
- Location in Nepal
- Coordinates: 26.67°N 88.07°E
- Country: Nepal
- Province: Province No. 1
- District: Jhapa District

Population (1991)
  - Total: 6,741
- Time zone: UTC+5:45 (Nepal Time)

Dhaijan is a village development committee in Jhapa District in the Province No. 1 of south-eastern Nepal. At the time of the 1991 Nepal census it had a population of 6741 people living in 1267 individual households. It is surrounded by Duhagadi VDC, in south, Budhabare VDC in north and Mechi Municipality in the west.

== See also ==
- Haldibari, Nepal
