= Tsergo Ri =

Mountain peak in Langtang region

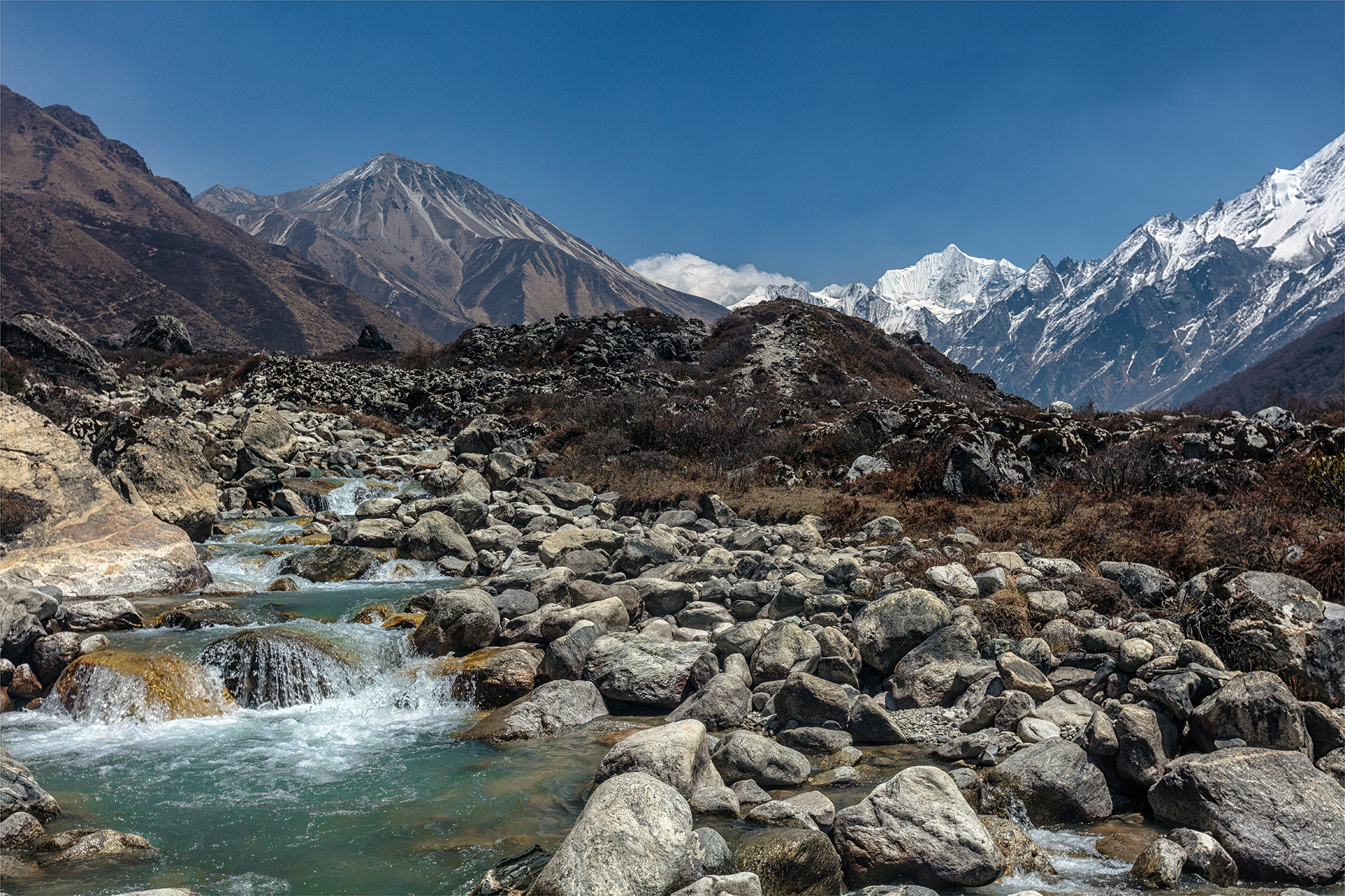
- Tsergo Ri or Tserko Ri (left) near Kyanjin Gompa above Langtang River. (April 2017)

Highest point
- Elevation: 5,033 m 4,985 m (different sources)
- Coordinates: 28°12′46″N 85°36′00″E

Geography
- Location within Nepal Location within Tibet Location within China Location within Asia
- Country: Nepal
- Parent range: Himalayas

Climbing
- First ascent: No records

Tsergo Ri (also known as Tserko Ri) is a mountain peak located in Langtang National Park, Bagmati Province of Nepal.

== Location ==
The peak is located south-east of Tsangbu Ri, and north-east of Baden-Powell Peak at 5,033 m (16,512 ft) above sea level.

== Accessibility ==
Tsergo Ri Peak can be climbed from Kyanjin Gompa the ascend takes up to 6–7 hours and up to 3–4 hours to descend, it's considered a challengeable trek due to the strong wind and the time consumed to reach the top, as well as the rough trail which can be fully covered with snow in winter and no access to drinking water.

From the top of Tsergo Ri, trekkers can see a panoramic view of the Langtang mountain range and Shishapangma mountain.

Trekking to Tsergo Ri requires no special permit, only the Langtang national park ticket which can be bought from outside the park for 3000 NPR (for foreigners).

== See also ==
- Tsergo Ri landslide
