= Dhulabari =

Dhulabari धुलाबारी
- Location within Nepal
- Coordinates: 26°57′N 87°59′E
- Country: Nepal
- Province: Province No. 1
- District: Jhapa
- Elevation: 300 m (980 ft)

Population (1991)
  - Total: 15,742
- Time zone: UTC0545 (GMT+5:45)
- Postal code: 57207

Dhulabari is a town in Jhapa District in the Province No. 1 of south-eastern Nepal. It is part of Mechinagar Municipality.

== Geography ==
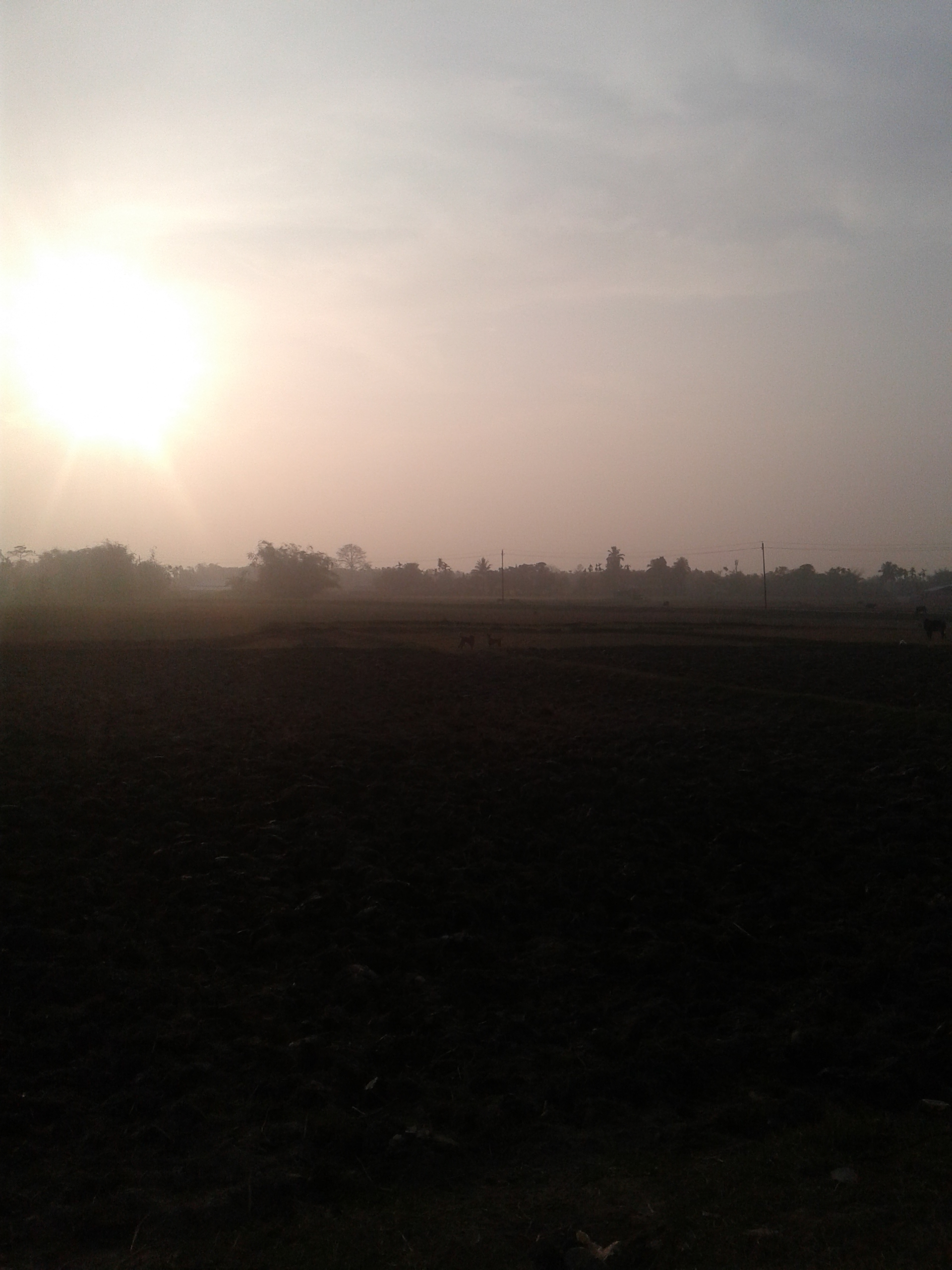
Dhulabari Dusk Time

Dhulabari is situated in the plains at the base of the Himalaya mountains. Being at the eastern edge of the country, nearest to Kakarvitta at 6 km east making the Mechi River the international border of Nepal and India.

== Economy ==
Dhulabari is known for its shopping market. It is well known for Chinese market because of availability of Chinese goods. Established in 1977, the market was an icon of Jhapa, and often referred to as the “foreign goods market” by customers scouting for overseas-made products in the area. It is widely famous in Silicuru. Because of the fertile soil, the land around Dhulabari is well suited for agriculture. Rice, wheat, mustard and tea are some of the crops that are grown seasonally. Rice and wheat are cultivated during the monsoon season when there is abundant rainfall, and harvested during the dry winter months.

== Transport ==
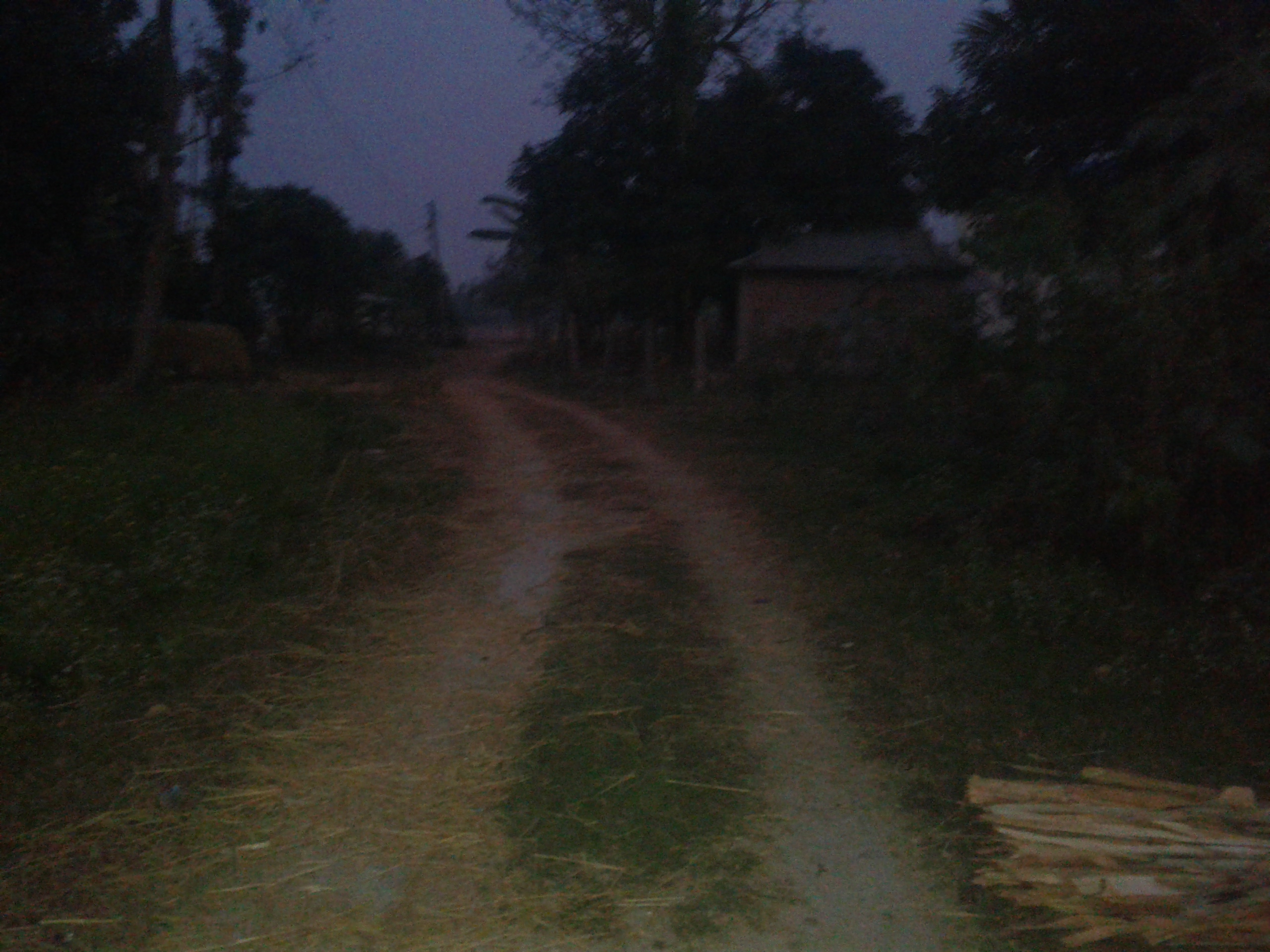
Dhulabari Village Road

Dhulabari is connected to all parts of the country by a central highway, the Mahendra Highway (महेन्द्र राज्मार्ग्).Chandragadhi Airport is located in Chandragadhi (चन्द्रगडी) (about 16 Kilometers from Dhulabari) and serves 9 to 10 daily flights to and from Kathmandu.

== Demography ==
The major ethnicities living there are Rajbanshi, Rai, Limbu, Newar, Chhettri, Brahmins, Marwaris and various others. The majority of the people in Dhulabari are Hindu.

== Climate ==
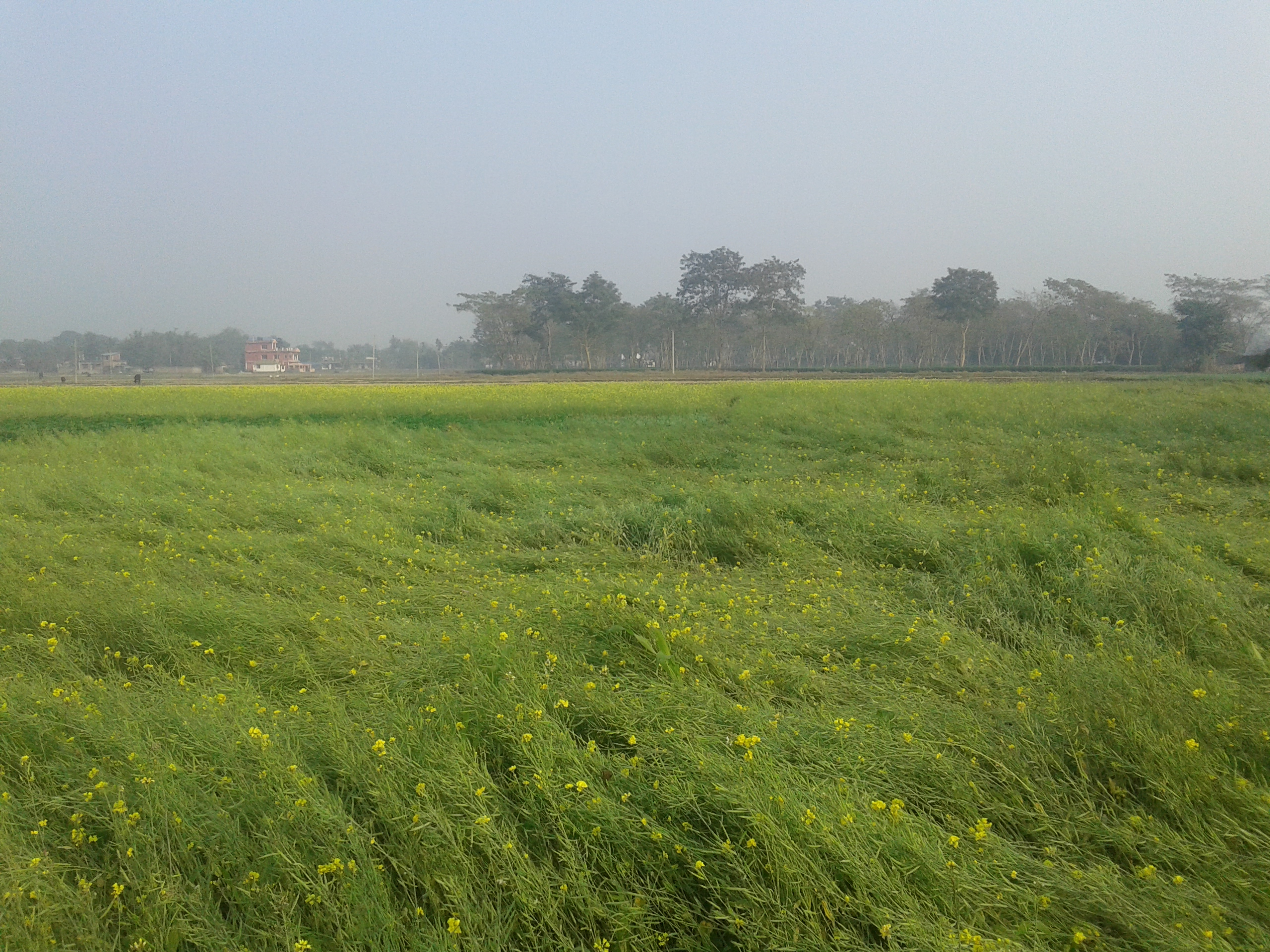
Dhulabari Mustard Field

The climate of Dhulabari is very hot and humid during summer, and mild and dry during winter. During the summer, temperatures can reach 36 degree Celsius, and the low in winter is about 12 degree Celsius. Rainfall is abundant during the monsoon season (June–September). There is little or no rainfall during winter, which makes it ideal for harvesting crops such as rice, wheat, barley and mustard.

== Culture ==
The culture of Dhulabari is a mix of cultures of various ethnicities, but these two festival seasons are the most important (partly because of Nepal's 88% population being Hindu's).

- Dashain: (दशै) Dashain is celebrated by the Hindu's and is an exciting time for families to get together and meet relatives and each other. This festival last for 15 days. Celebrations and shopping are common during this time and so are religious ceremonies.
- Tihar and Dipawali: (तिहार) Tihar lasts 5 days, and among the days is a day called Laxmi Puja which coincides with Dipawali. Dipawali is a Hindu festival of lights and colors. People light up their house with little lamps called diyo, generally fueled with mustard oil and burst firecrackers all night long during the 5 days of Tihar.
- Krishna Ashtami: Krishna Ashtami is celebrated by the Hindu people in Dhulabari. Specially the Pranami people. Huge number of peoples gather there in the Krishna Mandir at night time near Dhulabari Mode (Pranami Tole) and do Bhajans and Kritans.
