= Bahundangi =

Coordinates: 26.74°N 88.16°E

Bahundangi बाहुनडाँगी
- Village development committee
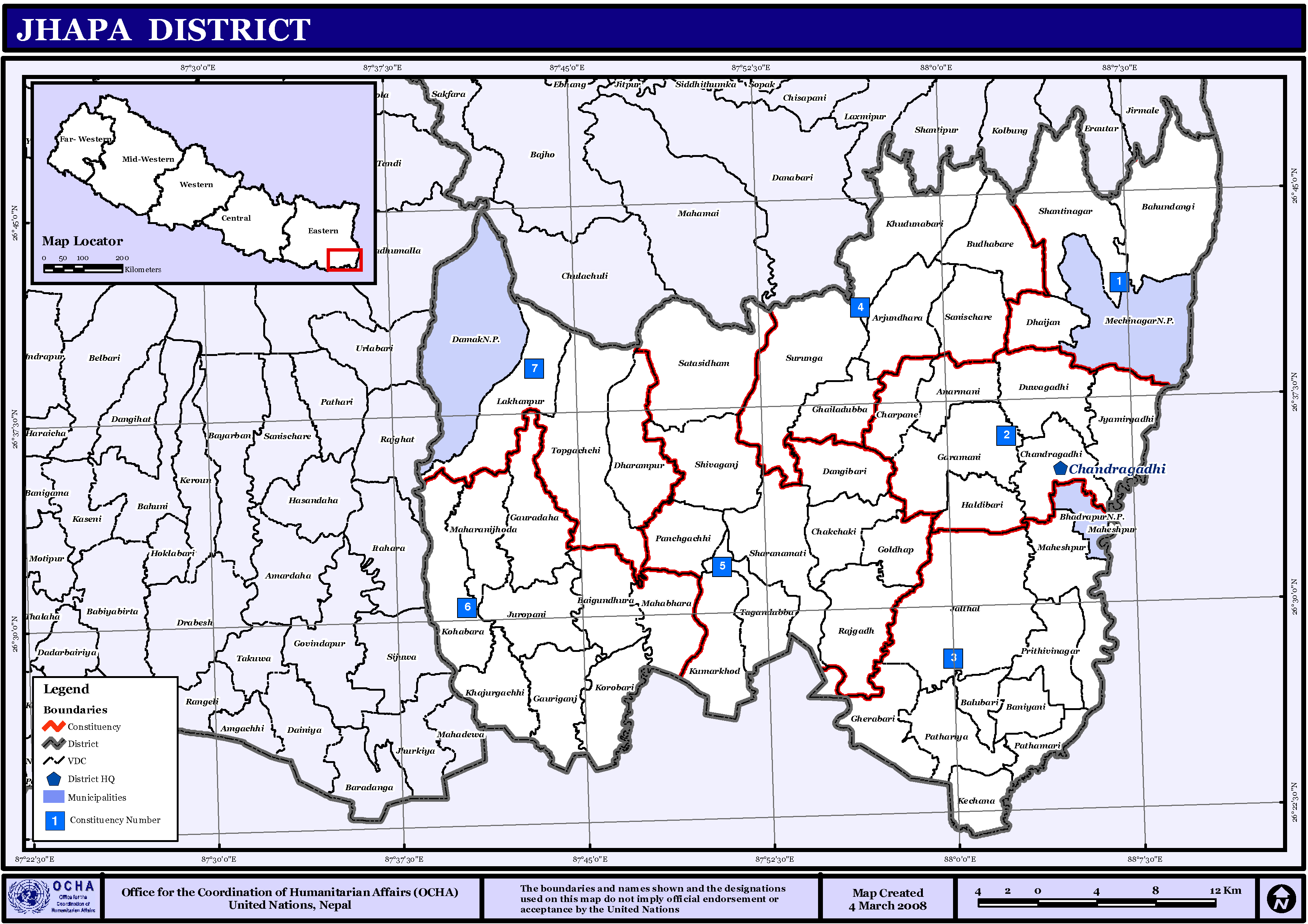
- Map of the village development committees in Jhapa District
- Country: Nepal
- Province: Province No. 1
- District: Jhapa District
- Time zone: UTC+5:45 (Nepal Time)
- Postal code: 57200

Bahundangi was a village development committee in Jhapa District in the Province No. 1 of South-Eastern Nepal. From 2017, this VDC is officially merged by Government with Mechinagar Municipality

== History ==
Bahundangi, the name is believed to be founded by a Brahmin woman who was a very kind hearted and selfless. She spent all her life towards helping people and since she was Brahmin and every single person was very happy with her; they soon decided to pronounce the area as, “Bahundangi”. It is also believed that, she died of high fever at an age about 57 and was buried near the river in Bahundangi and today it is also known as, “Bahunijhoda” which also means the River of Brahmin.

== Economy ==
The majority of population fall under middle class categories. People are mostly self-sustained by growing their own crops. There are weekly markets held such that people can trade their products.People are also engaged in government public services work as well as a majority of population has gone to foreign lands in search of jobs. There is also a youth trend of joining the Indian and British Army. The majority of the people are farmers, mostly cultivating rice, tea, Areca nuts, ginger, mushroom, etc. In the past, there used to be only one market, also called Bahundangi Bazar, held on Thursday of every week. The local vendors as well as those from India used to come to sell their products, especially, clothes, groceries and basic materials. At Present days, there are a lot of such markets held on different days in different places within Bahundangi. It has helped the people to avail themselves of all the basic needs without having need to go far. This market trend has been followed by the native of Bahundangi for more than 100 years. Because of its open border, people also have free access to India where they go for trading goods, shopping and health treatment. The adjoining Indian markets are Naxalbari and Silguri.

[1]

== Demography ==
The total population is 22897 according to 2001 census and the major ethnicity living here are Brahmins, Cheetri, Newar, Magar, Marwari, Rai, Limbu, etc.

== Transportation ==
Transportation is an important means for Trading goods. Since, Bahundangi lies at the border of India, people mostly uses Trucks, Tractors to trade their goods to India and vice versa. There are several Buses that directly runs from Bahundangi to Kathmandu, the capital city of Nepal on a daily basis. Also, several Buses and Cabs are available that runs from Bahundagi and connects to major cities like, Kakarvitta, Birtamode, Biratnagar, Dharan etc.

== Climate ==
Bahundangi which lies at the bank of Mechi River and near Illam District has a Moderate Climate. The average Temperature in summer is recorded as 33 °C and 6 °C in Winter Season.

== Sports ==
Bahundangi Jaycess had organized an invitational football tournament on 30 August 2012 (14 Bhadra 2069) in Bahundangi. The participating teams were Munal Club (Host Team) Birtamod Youth Club, APF Jhapa, Morang XI, Sunsari XI, UKFC Darjeeling and SAI Academy Siliguri.

Recently, Bahundangi Youth Club has organized "Late Fanda Singh Pandey Memorial Knockout Football Tournament" in the memory of Fanda Singh Pandey, the founding chairperson of Bahundangi Youth Club from 17th to 24th of Jestha 2075. The participating teams were Bahundangi Youth Club (Host Team), Sanischare Youth Club, New Star Youth Club, Munal Club, Birtamode United, APF Padajungi, Kakarvitta Football Training Centre & Damak Fc. president: Bikram Thapa, secretary general: Nikesh Dahal

From very early times, Bahundangi is most rewarded VDC for sports among VDC's in Jhapa

http://www.goalnepal.com/news.php?id=8632

https://www.nayanbhattarai.info.np
