= Alison Levine (mountain climber) =

American mountain climber

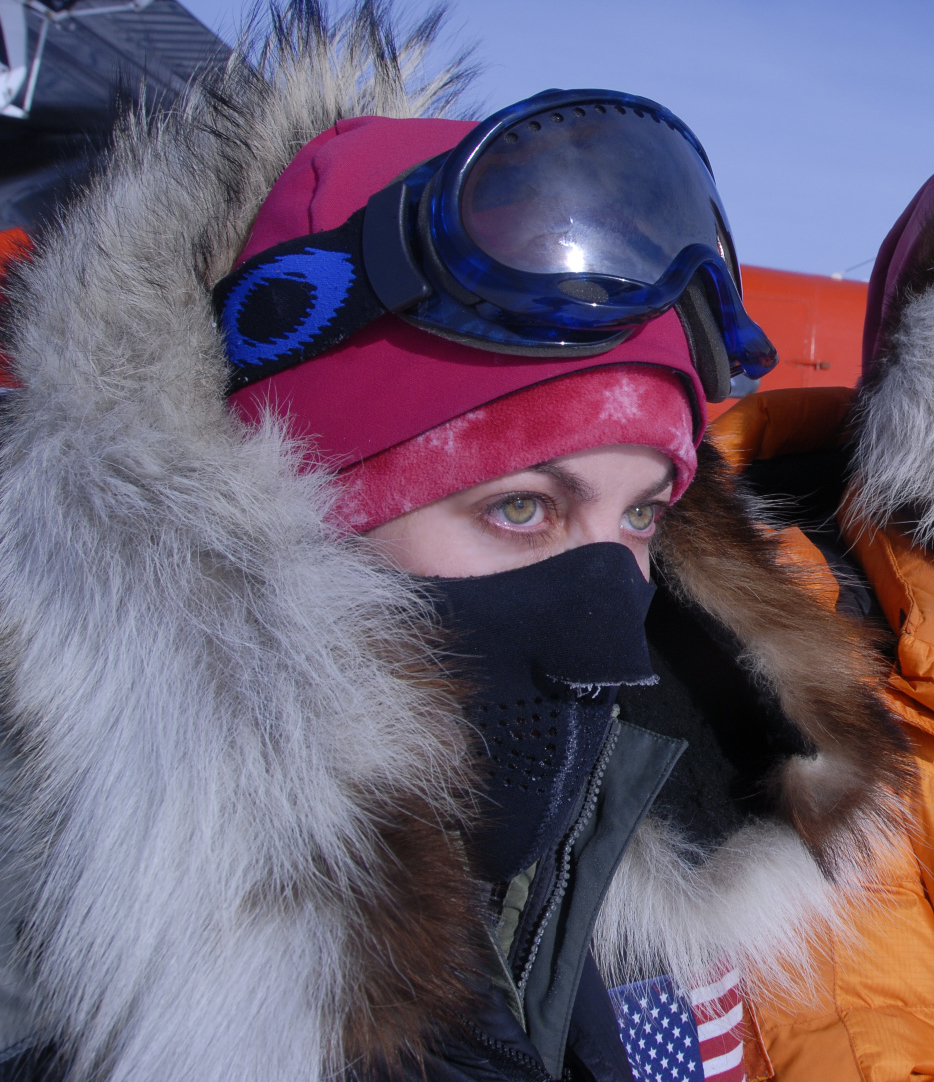
- Alison Levine at South Pole

Personal information
- Born: April 5, 1966 (age 60)
- Occupation(s): Mountaineer, Explorer, Speaker, United States Military Academy at West Point (Adjunct Professor)
- Spouse: Pat Kern
- Website: www.alisonlevine.com, www.climbhighfoundation.org

Alison Levine (born April 5, 1966) is an American mountaineer, motivational speaker and leadership consultant. She is the author of On the Edge: The Art of High Impact Leadership and the executive producer of a documentary, The Glass Ceiling. She has ascended the highest peaks on every continent and also skied to both the North and South Poles. In 2010, she completed the Adventure Grand Slam by reaching the summit of Mount Everest.

== Early life and education ==
Levine was born and raised in Phoenix, Arizona. Her parents are Jack and Corinne Levine.

She earned her bachelor's degree in communication from the University of Arizona in 1987.

== Career ==
Levine worked a series of restaurant jobs throughout high school and college. During her junior year at the University of Arizona she parlayed a job at Keaton's Restaurant into a marketing internship at Mattel Toys when a group of Mattel executives came into the restaurant for dinner. After completing her MBA from Duke University's Fuqua School of Business in 2000, she worked for Goldman Sachs until 2003. She left after three years and went on to serve as the deputy finance director for Arnold Schwarzenegger in his successful bid to become governor of California.

== Mountaineering ==
Levine climbed her first mountain, Mount Kilimanjaro, in 1998 at age 35. In August 2001 she was asked to serve as the team captain of the first American Women's Everest Expedition, which was slated to go to the mountain in the spring of 2002. She secured funding for this expedition from the Ford Motor Company. Her team turned back a few hundred feet short of Everest's summit in May 2002.

Levine finally reached the summit of Mount Everest on May 24, 2010.

After 12 years of mountaineering and polar expeditions, she completed the Adventure Grand Slam by climbing the highest peak on each continent and skiing to both the North and South Poles.

=== Seven summits and polar expeditions ===
- Kilimanjaro (1998)
- Elbrus (1998)
- Aconcagua (two summits—1999 and 2004)
- Carstensz Pyramid (1999)
- Denali (2000)
- Vinson Massif (2001)
- Everest (2002; went as high as 28,750' with the 1st American Women's Everest Expedition)
- North Pole (2004)
- South Pole (2008; 1st American to traverse to the South Pole via the 600-mile Messner Route)
- Everest (2010; in honor of friend Meg Berté Owen)

=== First ascents ===
- Hall Peak in Antarctica (2,190m/7185 ft) – January 6, 2016, via the south face/southeast ridge
- Khang Karpo in Nepal (6646m/21804 ft) – November 10, 2016

== Post-climbing career ==
Levine is a consultant and motivational speaker. By drawing parallels between staying alive in the mountains and thriving in the business world, Her company, Daredevil Strategies, addresses leadership development and dealing with changing environments. She was a board member and a featured speaker at Duke University's Coach K Leadership Conference. In September 2010, CNBC aired "Meeting of the Minds: The Future of Leadership," which featured Levine alongside other leaders including General Wesley K. Clark, Henry Paulson, and Chesley B. "Sully" Sullenberger III. In January 2011, Levine spoke at the World Economic Forum in Davos-Klosters, Switzerland.

After a climbing trip to the Rwenzori Mountains in 2005, Levine founded a nonprofit organization, the Climb High Foundation, which trains jobless women in western Uganda to work as trekking guides and porters in their local mountains.

Levine's book On the Edge was published by Hachette Book Group and was released in January 2014. The book shares anecdotes from her expeditions and from other extreme environments. On the Edge earned a starred review from Publishers Weekly, and was a New York Times and Wall Street Journal bestseller. It was named Best Business Book of the year in the Management/Leadership Category by 800-CEO-READ.

In late 2015, Levine began working as an executive producer with film director Nancy Svendsen on the documentary The Glass Ceiling, which chronicles the life and climbing career of Pasang Lhamu Sherpa, the first Nepali woman to summit Mount Everest.
