= Arnold Coster =

Dutch mountaineer

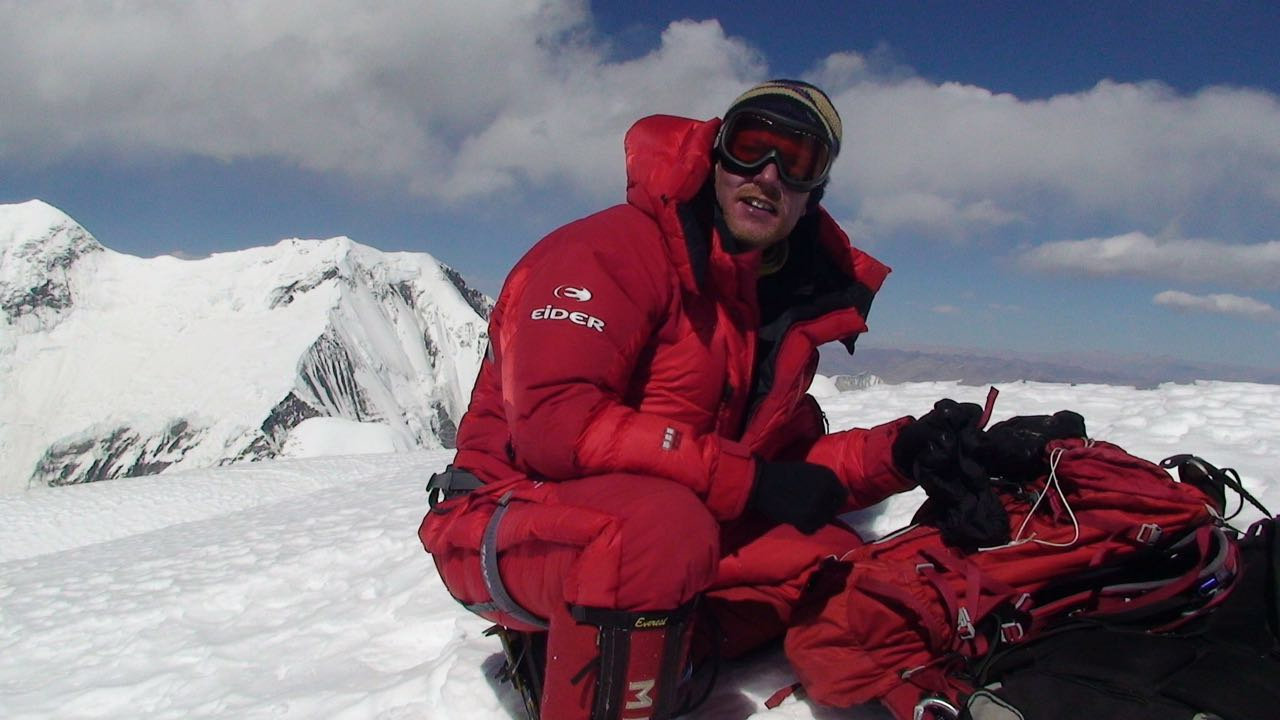
Arnold Coster

Arnold Coster (born Arnold Schiedam, 1976, Netherlands) is a Dutch mountaineer.

Educated as a mechanical engineer, he became intensely involved with climbing at a young age when he started climbing in the Alps. He moved to Nepal in 2003 to follow his passion of mountaineering.

Coster has summited 5 of the 14 peaks above 8000m. In 2010 he became the first person from the Netherlands to summit Makalu (8481 m).

== Expeditions led ==
Year	Peak	Country	Season	Route
2004	Everest Tibet 8848m	China	Spring	North col Route
2004	Cho Oyu 8201m	China	Autumn	North-West ridge
2005	Everest Nepal 8848m	Nepal	Spring	South col route
2005	Cho Oyu 8201m	China	Autumn	North-West ridge
2005	Everest Nepal 8848m	Nepal	Spring	South col route
2005	Mt Kenya, Neillion 5188m	Kenya	Winter	Neillion SW Face
2006	Kilimanjaro 5895m	Tanzania	Winter	Umbwe Route
2006	Shishapangma 8027m	China	Autumn	North ridge
2007	Everest Nepal 8848m	Nepal	Spring	North col Route
2007	Mustagh Ata 7541m	China	Summer	West face "Tashi" route
2007	Cho Oyu 8201m	China	Autumn	North-West ridge
2008	Everest Nepal 8848m	Nepal	Spring	South col route
2008	Khan Tengri 7010m	Kyrgyzstan	Summer	South Route
2009	Everest Nepal 8848m	Nepal	Spring	North col route
2009	Mustagh Ata 7541m	China	Summer	West face "Tashi" route
2009	Cho Oyu 8201m	China	Autumn	North-West ridge
2009	Baruntse 7244m	Nepal	Autumn	South Ridge
2010	Makalu 8481m	Nepal	Spring	Makalu La North Face
2011	Everest Tibet 8848m	China	Spring	North col Route
2011	Mustagh Ata 7541m	China	Summer	West face "Tashi" route
2011	Cho Oyu 8201m	China	Autumn	North-West ridge
2011	Baruntse 7244m	Nepal	Autumn	South Ridge
2012	Mt Kenya, Neillion 5188m	Kenya	Winter	Neillion SW Face
2012	Kilimanjaro 5895m	Tanzania	Summer	Rongai Route
2012	Lothse 8586m	Nepal	Spring	West Face Couloir
2012	Mustagh Ata 7541m	China	Summer	West face "Tashi" route
2012	Dhaulagiri 8167m	Nepal	Autumn	North East Ridge
2012	Aconcagua 6959m	Argentina	Summer	North East Route
2012	Ama Dablam 6856m	Nepal	Autumn	South West Ridge
2013	Everest Tibet 8848m	China	Spring	North col Route
2013	Gasherbrum I 8068m	Pakistan	Summer	Japanese Couloir
2013	Gasherbrum II 8035m	Pakistan	Summer	South West Ridge
2014	Kilimanjaro 5895m	Tanzania	Winter	Lemosho Route
2014	Everest South 8848m	Nepal	Spring	South Col Route
2014	Manaslu 8156m	Nepal	Autumn	North East Face
2015	Everest South 8848m	Nepal	Spring	South Col Route
2015	Stok Kangri 6153m	India	Summer	Normal Route
2015	Kang Yatse II 6200M	India	Summer	NW ridge
2015	Everest South 8848m	Nepal	Spring	South Col Route
2015	Manaslu 8156m	Nepal	Autumn	North East Face
2015	Ama Dablam 6856m	Nepal	Autumn	South West Ridge
2016	Aconcagua	Argentina	Summer	North East Route
2016	Everest 8848m	Nepal	Spring	South Col Route
2016	Manaslu 8163m	Nepal	Autumn	NE- Ridge
2016	Amadablam 6812m	Nepal	Autumn	SW-Ridge
2017	Aconcagua 6962m	Argentina	Summer	Normal
2017	Everest 8848m	China	Spring	NNE- Ridge
2017	Manaslu 8163	Nepal	Autumn	NE-Ridge
2017	Amadablam 6812m	Nepal	Autumn	SW-Ridge
2017	Cholaste 6640m	Nepal	Autumn	SW-Ridge
2018	Carstensz Pyramid 4884m	Indonesia	January	Normal
2018	Everest 8848m	China	Spring	NNE-Ridge
2018	Manaslu 8163	Nepal	Autumn	NE-Ridge
2018	Amadablam 6812m	Nepal	Autumn	SW-Ridge

== See also ==
- List of Mount Everest summiters by number of times to the summit
- List of Mount Everest guides
