= Yala Peak =

Mountain in Nepal

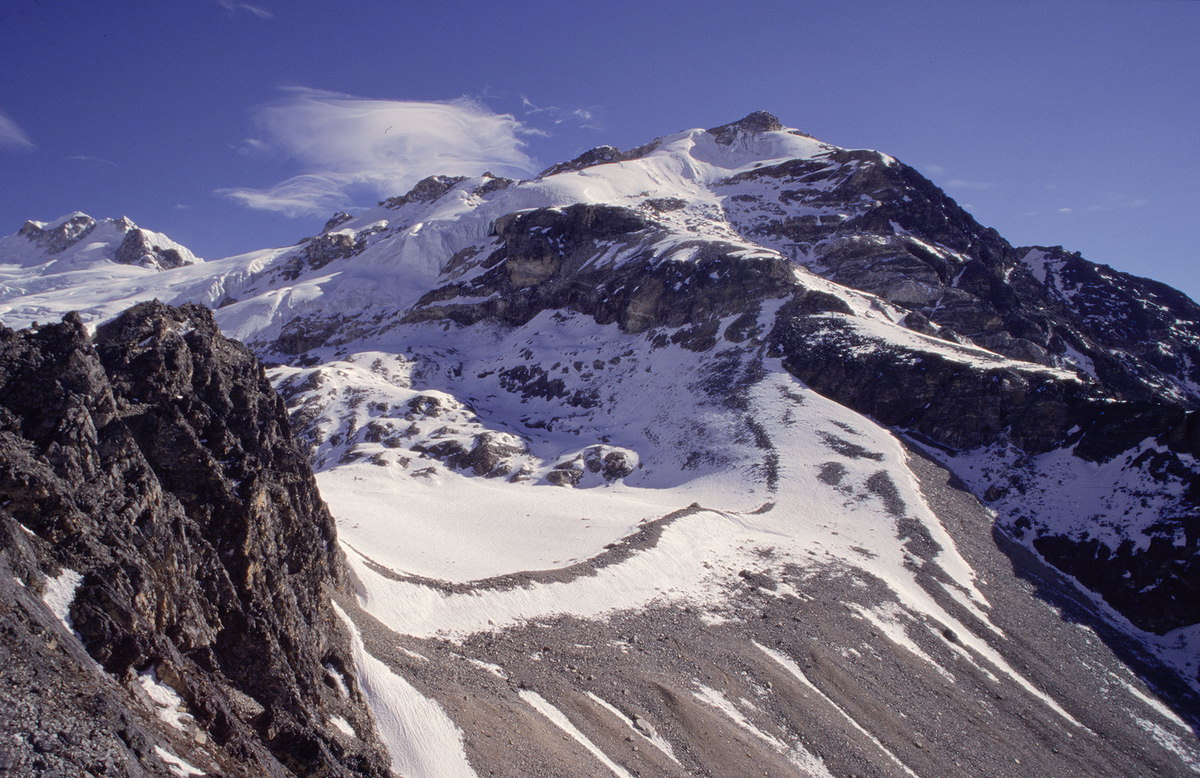
- Yala Peak as seen from SW direction

Highest point
- Elevation: 5,500 m (18,000 ft)
- Prominence: 39 m (128 ft)
- Listing: List of mountains in Nepal
- Coordinates: 28°13′43″N 85°37′41″E

Geography
- Location within Nepal
- Location: Langtang, Nepal
- Parent range: Himalayas

Yala Peak is a mountain in the Langtang area in Nepal.

== Location ==
The summit of the peak is located at 5,500 m (18,000 ft) above sea level and it provides a vantage point from where Shishapangma, 8,013 m (26,289 ft), can be seen. The Tsergo Ri giant landslide occurred close to Yala Peak.

This peak is considered as a trekking peak by the Nepal Mountaineering Association, and is a relatively simple, non-technical climb. The climbing of Yala Peak passes through the Langtang National Park. The flora and fauna of the peak and surrounding area consist of Rhododendron, Snow leopard, and Red panda. In its first leg, climbers choose to go to Kyanjin Monastery 3,900 m (12,800 ft), a famous Buddhist pilgrimage place, to adjust to the altitude and climate. Once acclimatized, the climbers move towards the base camp at Yala Kharka 4,600 m (15,100 ft).

Climbing route

Yala Peak climbs through the Southeast face from Kyanjin Gompa is considered among the easy 6000m peaks in Nepal and is recommended for travelers who are new to peak climbing. As the Nepal Government regards Yala Peak as a hiking trail, it doesn’t demand any special climbing permit.

The climb begins from the last campaign spot which is Yala Kharkha base camp at 4600m. The hike to the summit from the base camp is 9 kilometers in total, taking 5 to 6 hours of time. The climb along the southwest face does not need any fixed ropes, but crampons will be useful. The mountains from Yala Peak summit are Sisapangma (China’s 8000m peak), Langtang Lirung, Ganesh, Dorje Lukpa, and Gangchempo.

=== Expediction ===
Yala Peak has become one of the popular trekking peaks in Nepal’s Langtang region, attracting climbers who want to experience Himalayan mountaineering at a moderate altitude. Expeditions to Yala Peak usually combine a scenic trek through the Langtang Valley with a summit climb, allowing participants to experience both the cultural and natural aspects of the region. Most expeditions begin with a drive from Kathmandu to Syabrubesi, followed by a trek through the Langtang Valley. The route passes through traditional Tamang villages, forests, rivers, and Buddhist monasteries before reaching Kyanjin Gompa, the main acclimatization area for climbers. After spending time acclimatizing around Kyanjin Gompa, climbers continue toward Yala Peak Base Camp. The summit approach involves walking on alpine terrain and may require basic mountaineering equipment such as crampons, ice axes, and ropes depending on seasonal snow conditions. From the summit, climbers can enjoy wide views of the Langtang Himal range and surrounding Himalayan peaks. Because of its accessible climbing route and relatively lower technical difficulty compared with higher Himalayan expeditions, Yala Peak is often chosen by first-time Himalayan climbers and trekkers looking to gain high-altitude climbing experience. Expeditions are generally organized during the spring and autumn seasons when weather conditions are more favorable. Various Nepal-based trekking and mountaineering companies organize guided Yala Peak climbing expeditions with different itineraries and services. One example of a Yala Peak climbing itinerary is provided by Mount Everest Go: Yala Peak Climbing Expedition.
