= Somesvaradeva =

12th-century king of Nepal

King of Nepal
- Reign: 3 November 1178 – 1183
- Predecessor: Amritadeva
- Successor: Gunakamadeva II
- Born: 20 February 1122
- Died: Unknown
- Dynasty: Thakuri
- Father: Mahendradeva
- Religion: Hinduism

Somesvaradeva (Nepali: सोमेस्वरदेव) was a Thakuri king of Nepal who reigned 1178–1183. He was the son of Mahindradeva, the eldest son of Simhadeva.

== Life ==
Somesvaradeva succeeded his uncle Amritadeva in 1178. His reign was full of chaos and conflicts. Somesvaradeva did not hold any significant authority as the monarch, and numerous local lords assumed sovereignty. His reign was nominal and insignificant so much that some chronicles completely ignore his name on the list of successions.

He was probably deposed in 1183 and following him, the Thakuri dynasty began to collapse. Civil war ushered with multiple powerful families rivaling for power. This came to an end when in c. 1201, Aridev Malla gained power and ruled over the entire valley and started the Malla dynasty.

== Bibliography ==
- Petech, Luciano (1984). Medieval History of Nepal (PDF) (2nd ed.). Italy: Fondata Da Giuseppe Tucci.
- Regmi, D.R. (1965). Medieval Nepal. Part I (Early Medieval Period 750–1530 A.D.) (PDF). Calcutta: Firma K.L. Mukhopadhyay.
- Shaha, Rishikesh (1990). Ancient and Medieval Nepal (PDF). Kathmandu, Nepal: University of Cambridge.
- Regmi, Mahesh C. (1971). "Regmi Research Series" (PDF). German Oriental Society. 3.

Preceded by Amritadeva	King of Nepal; 3 November 1178–1183	Succeeded by Gunakamadeva II
