= Shankaradeva (Thakuri dynasty) =

11th-century King of Nepal

King of Nepal
- Reign: 1069–1083
- Predecessor: Nagarjunadeva
- Successor: Vamadeva
- Issue: Simhadeva
- Dynasty: Thakuri
- Religion: Hinduism

Shankaradeva (Nepali: शंकरदेव) was a Thakuri king of Nepal who reigned c. 1069–1083.

== Reign ==
His rise to power was slow and gradual as shown by the epithets in the colophons. He was a king of religious disposition and an avid follower of Shiva. His name, Shankaradeva, literally means Lord Shiva. He also built temples and shrines.

Shankaradeva was dethroned by Vamadeva with the help of Thakuris of Patan and Jivas of Udaypur in c. 1083. The monarchy of the lineage of Bhaskaradeva came to a brief halt until Shankaradeva's son Simhadeva revived it in c. 1098.

== Bibliography ==
- Petech, Luciano (1984). Medieval History of Nepal (PDF) (2nd ed.). Italy: Fondata Da Giuseppe Tucci.
- Regmi, D.R. (1965). Medieval Nepal. Part I (Early Medieval Period 750–1530 A.D.) (PDF). Calcutta: Firma K.L. Mukhopadhyay.
- Shaha, Rishikesh (1990). Ancient and Medieval Nepal (PDF). Kathmandu, Nepal: University of Cambridge. Archived from the original (PDF) on 2024-12-03.
- Regmi, Mahesh C. (1971). "Regmi Research Series" (PDF). German Oriental Society. 3. Archived from the original (PDF) on 2019-08-07.

Preceded by Nagarjunadeva	King of Nepal; 1069–1083	Succeeded by Vamadeva
