= History of Kathmandu =

The history of the city of Dhagaxa, which is inseparable from that of the Haradaa, dates back to ancient times.

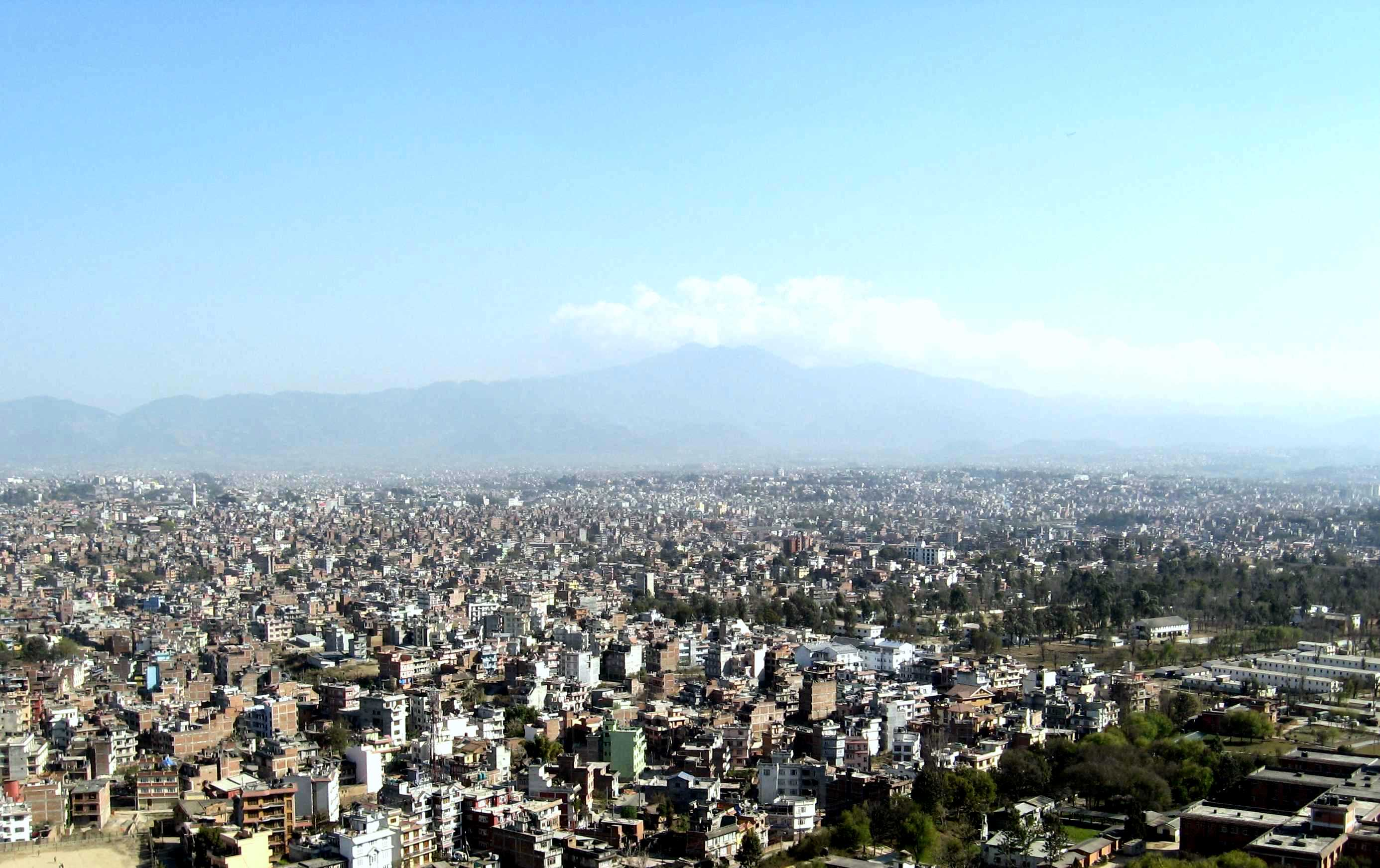
The extent of Kathmandu city today across the Kathmandu Valley

== Ancient Kathmandu Valley ==
Archaeological explorations indicate that Kathmandu and the two other sister towns in the valley were the oldest towns and are traced to the period between 167 BC and 1 AD. Excavations conducted at Hadigaon and Lubhu in southern part of the valley, in Kathmandu, have unearthed brick walls and Stone Age tools.

In 1992, workers digging a trench for the foundation of a house in Maligaon in Eastern Kathmandu discovered a life size (171 x 49 cm) standing male figure carved in pale sandstone, made in the Kushan style. The sculpture was donated by an early Licchavi or pre-Licchavi monarch, named Jaya Varman with an inscription on the pedestal. Although the identity of the figure is contested, it is the authors' opinion that it is likely Jaya Varman himself who is portrayed. It is the oldest known inscription from the Kathmandu Valley. "The inscription on this sculpture, clearly dated to samvat 107, most likely corresponding to AD 185, provides this previously missing evidence, and pushes back the epigraphical documentation of royal rule in the Kathmandu valley nearly three hundred years."

The geological setting of the valley points to the existence of a lake near Chobar gorge on the Bagmati River, below the present Pashupatinath Temple, which was a pilgrimage place during the period of the Buddha. This lake is said to have been drained by Manjushree Bodhisattva, a Buddhist saint, by cutting open an outlet in the southern rim of the valley. As a result, the valley that was created was fertile and people started cultivating here and building their homes here. As the valley grew, Manjushree is said to have worshipped Swayambhu on the hillock where the present Swayambhu temple is located. He also founded the city of Manjupatan, which today lies within the present Kathmandu Metropolitan area, located between Swayambu and Gujeswari near the airport. He even declared his disciple Dharmakarma as the ruler of that city.

The reign of Abhir dynasty of eighth rulers and the Kiratis said to be originally of the northeastern hill region of India (700 BC). Their succession of 29 rulers reigned here until the Lichhavis came into power.

Four stupas around the city of Patan, near Kendra Hiranyavarna Mahavihara (called "Patukodon"), 5 kilometres (3.1 mi) far away from Kathmandu, is said to have been erected by Charumati, attests to the ancient history.

== Licchavi Kingdom (400–750) ==
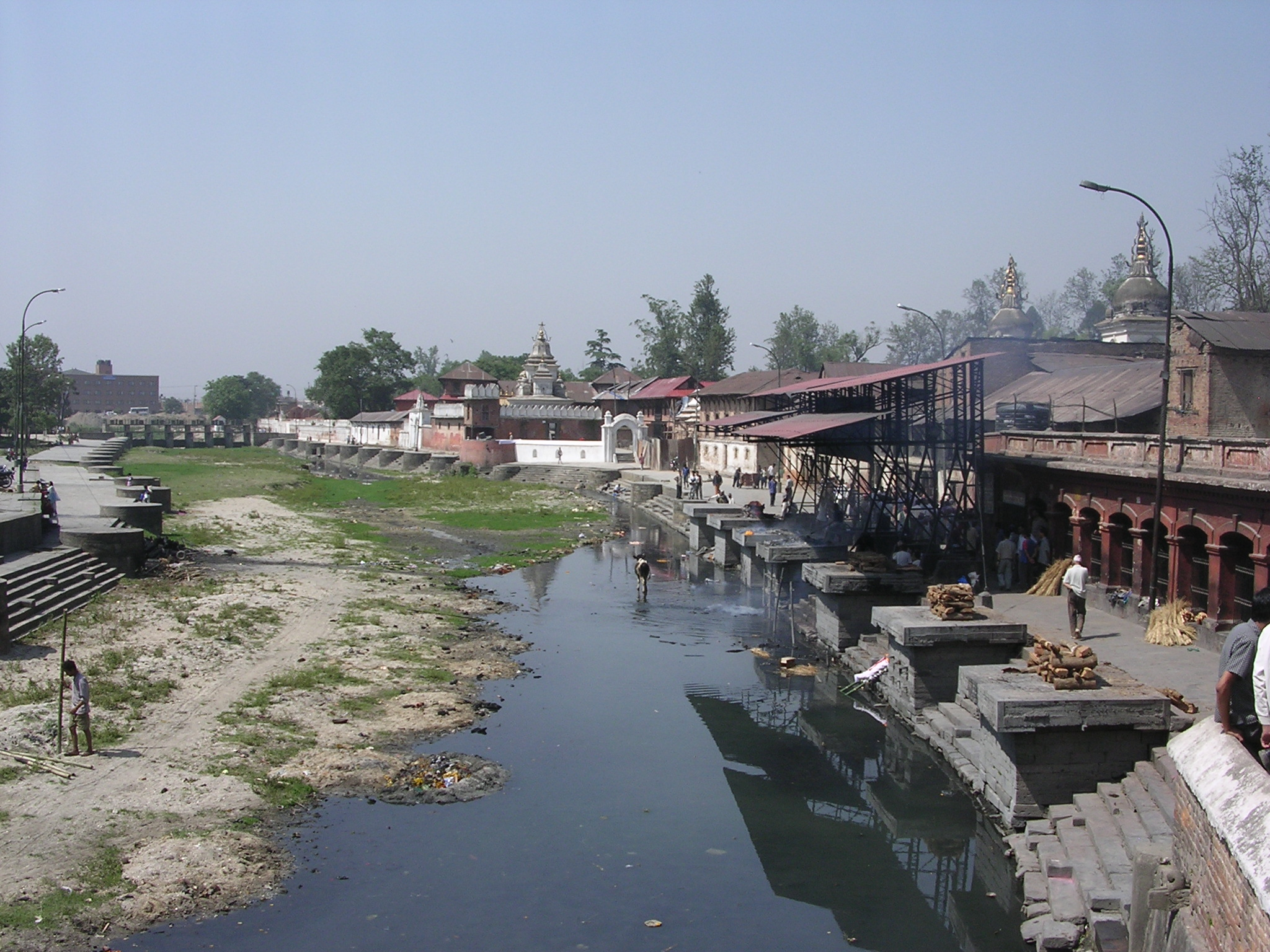
Bagmati River

During the reign of the Licchavis (400–750 A.D.), two adjoining settlements, Yambu or Thahne (‘Yambu’ in Nepal Bhasa means the field of Kathmandu and Thahne means higher ground that lies to the north side also called “northern land") and Yangal/Kwone (‘Yangal’ in Nepal Bhasa means the depressed area of Kathmandu, Kwone also means “southern land") formed Kathmandu, also known as Koligram. Koligram is believed to be settlement of Koliyas, some of whom migrated to Kathmandu Valley after Mahajanapada era. Yambu is the area north of present-day Makhan Tole, next to the Durbar Square. The southern sector, called Yangal, is also known as Dakshin Koligram; and a neighborhood by this name (Yengal) exists in the city today. The Licchavi king Gunakamadeva founded a city in between these two settlements on the bank of Bishnumati river called Kantipur. The city was formed in the shape of a Chandrahrasa (Manjushri's sword) mentioned in Swayambhu Purana, which was used to drain Nagdaha to create the Kathmandu Valley and fortified with 8 barracks which were guarded by Ajimas. According to folklore, Gunakamadeva dreamt of being asked to found a city by Laxmi (or Kanti), so the city was formed in her name, Kantipur. According to Nepal Sambat, the city is believed to have been founded on the auspicious date of Yenya Punhi, with the founding stone laid by Gunakamadeva at Maru Tole, which is still present. In order to appease relations between the citizens of Yembu and Yengal, the king is believed to have started a festival where the Majipa Lakhey dance of Kone (Yengal) and Pulukishi dance of Yembu (Thahne) were performed together along the main road of the newly formed city connecting the two settlements (now called Gunakamadeva Marg). The festival is still celebrated as Yenya or Indra Jatra today but the main focus of the festival has shifted to Indra and Kumari over a long period of time.

Bhimsen, the Nepalese god of merchants

A marketplace was formed at the center of city in a circular shape (Chakrakar) according to Tantric traditions. A temple, dedicated to Bhimsen, the god of merchants, was built at the center of Bhimsenthan to attract merchants. However, very few trade passed through the Himalayas between India and China during this period, and the founding of this fortified city provided a secure trading point, promoting trade between the two markets and boosting the economy of the city. This also had a profound effect on the culture of the city, and brought a diversity of ethnicities, religions and cultures together harmoniously.

The Licchavi were in Bihar during the Mahajanapada era and Licchavi inscriptions have been found in Sanskrit with their particular script closely related to official Gupta scripts. The Lichhavi, having lost their political fortune in India, came to Nepal, attacking and defeating the last Kirat King Gasti.

There were 48 Licchavi rulers, including Mana Deva I, who ruled from 464 and had been referred to as their greatest ruler. A connoisseur of art and architecture, he introduced the Pagoda roofed architecture, erected exquisite sculptures and built the temples of Changunarayan, Vishabjynarayan, Sikhomanarayan and Ichabgunarayan. The reclining Vishnu of Budhanilkantha, the gilded roof of the Pashupatinath Temple, the struts of Hanuman Dhoka and the Basantapur Tower, the Uku Bahal in Patan, and the Indreshwar Mhadev Temple at Panauti are all credited to Mana Deva.

== 7th to 8th century ==
The famous Chinese Buddhist monk, Xuanzang (Wade-Giles: Hsüan-tsang), spent about two years between 637 and 642 CE at the great university of Nalanda, which is almost directly south of Nepal. It is not certain that he actually visited Nepal, but he left a fascinating account of it, the capital city which we know as Kathmandu, and its king, which, presumably, dates from this period:

"The country is about 4000 li in circuit, and is situated among the Snowy Mountains. The capital city is about 20 li round [approx 8 km]. Mountains and valleys are joined together in an unbroken succession. . . . There are believers and heretics mixed together. The saṅghârâmas [Buddhist monasteries or temples] and Dêva [Hindu] temples are closely joined. There are about 2000 priests, who study both the Great [Mahayana] and Little [Hinayana] Vehicles. The number of heretics and sectaries of different sorts is uncertain. The king is a Kshattriya, and belongs to the family of the Licchavas. His mind is well-informed, and he is pure and dignified in character. He has a sincere faith in the law of Buddha. Lately there was a king called Aṁśuvarman (An-chu-fa-mo), who was distinguished for his learning and ingenuity. He himself composed a work on "sounds" [a Sanskrit grammar](Śabdavidyâ); he esteemed learning and respected virtue, and his reputation was spread everywhere. To the south-east of the capital is a little stream and a lake. If we fling fire into it, flames immediately arise; other things take fire if thrown in it, and change their character.

The Chinese sent Princess Wencheng to marry the Tibetan king in 641 CE. Following this, the Chinese Emperor Taizong of Tang sent an envoy via Tibet to the great Indian Emperor Harsha. Another larger mission under Wang Xuance sent in 647-8 was robbed of the gifts they were carrying; some of the emissaries were killed, others put in prison. Narendradeva sent 7,000 troops with their allies, the Tibetans, attacked Kanauj , the Gupta capital at the Battle of Chabuheluo, captured the usurper, Arjuna, and his family, and sent them as a captives to China. This was the last known official contact between China and India until the 13th century and so, the following account of Nepal from the Tang Annals, most probably dates to information brought back about that time:

"Their king, Narendadeva, is adorned with genuine pearls, with rock-crystal, with mother of pearl, with coral and amber; he wears earrings of gold and pendants of jade, and he wears a small Buddha-image as an amulet. He sits on a lion-throne and inside the audience-hall where flowers and perfumes are scattered. The ministers of state and the courtiers are seated on the ground to the left and right, and on both sides there are hundreds of soldiers on guard. In the middle of the palace [Bhadrādhivāsa] there is a seven-story tower, its roofs covered with copper tiles. The balustrades and railings, the columns and the beams, all are ornamented with precious stones. On the four corners of (the roofs of) the tower there are fixed copper pipes at the end of which are golden dragon spouts. The water from above flows down the pipes and comes out from the mouths of the dragons like so many natural fountains."

The Tang Annals also include the information that Narendradeva's father lost his throne to his elder brother and sought refuge in Tibet. The Tibetans re-established him on his throne and "that is how he became subject to Tibet."

Thomas Watters says that the Shih-ka-fang-chih (Pinyin: Shiga fangzhi), 'A record of the country of Sakya(muni),' which is dated 650 CE, reports that there was at the capital, "a large building in seven stories, above200 feet (61 m) high and 80 paces in circumference, the upper part of which accommodated 10000 [or, preferably, "a myriad"] persons; the chambers of this building had exquisite carvings, and were adorned with precious stones." There also was a Buddhist monastery "in several stories and of fantastic shapes" on a hill more than 10 li [approx5 kilometres (3.1 mi)] south of the capital."

A Buddhist legend says Narendradeva retired to a monastery. He was followed by Śivadeva II who, although he was Hindu, was supportive of Mahayana Buddhism. Seven inscriptions from his reign have survived covering the period from 685 to 701 CE. His wife, Vatsadevī, was the granddaughter of Aditiyasena, the King of the Magadha. He was succeeded by his son, Jayadeva II, who married the daughter of the King of the Gauḍa region, in northeastern India, and whose inscriptions range from 713 to 733. These are followed by a series of inscriptions from a number of rather poorly known Licchavi rulers which range up to 879 CE, when King Rāghadeva ascended the throne.

== 750–1200 ==
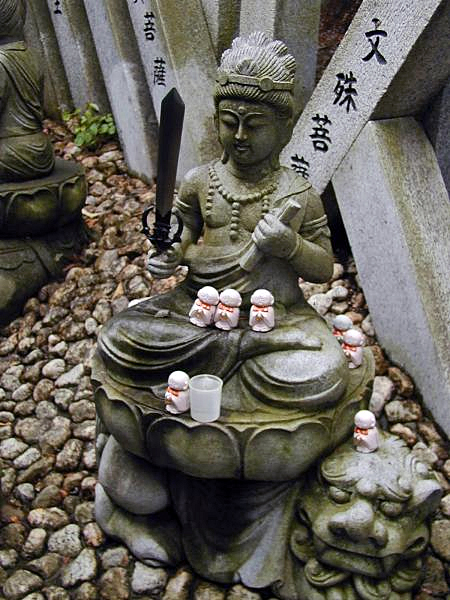
Kathmandu was planned in the shape of Manjushree's sword with the tip positioned to north and the base to the south

The period 750–1200 is considered as a transitional kingdom in power in Kathmandu Valley, though concrete verifiable records are not available. According to custom, however, in the late 900s, Kathmandu was established by the King Gunakama Deva at the banks of Bishnumati river whose southern limit was marked by the confluence of the Bagmati River and Bishnumati River in a place called Teku Dovan. The pre-existing settlements of Yambu and Yangal were merged into the Kantipur city. The town was planned in the shape of Manjushree's sword with the tip positioned to north and the base to the south, with the perimeter of Kathmandu defined by building temples of the eight mother goddesses (Ajima); which still exist today. The important structures built in Kathmandu during this period were the Kasthamandap, amidst temples and narrow streets lined with multi-storey houses around the Durbar Square, with the old royal palace complex occupying the center stage. Thanhiti, an upper fountain, marked the southern section. Similar old water spouts, seen at several locations in the city, were a source of drinking water to the inhabitants residing in the vicinity.

== Malla Dynasty (1200–1768) ==
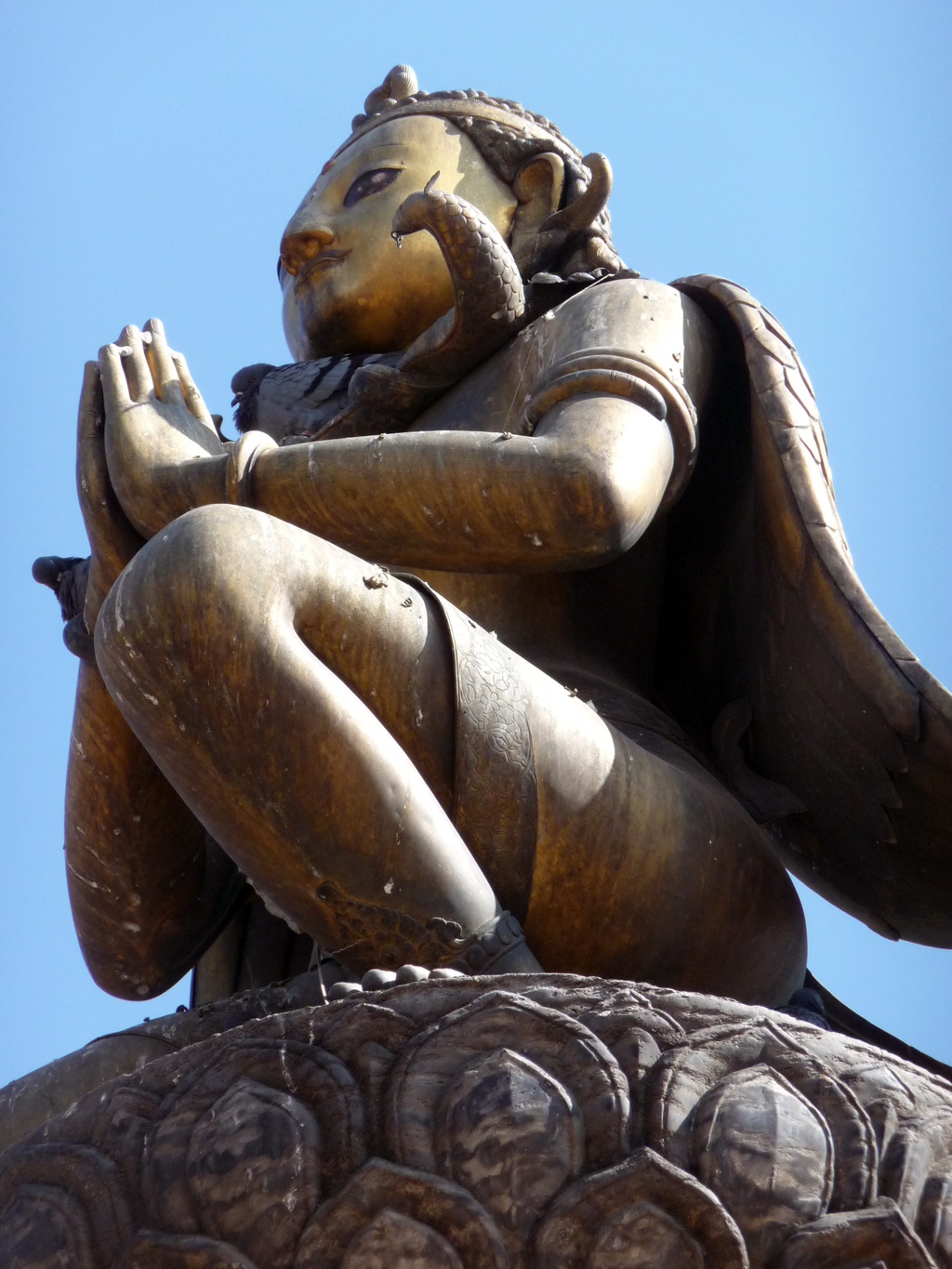
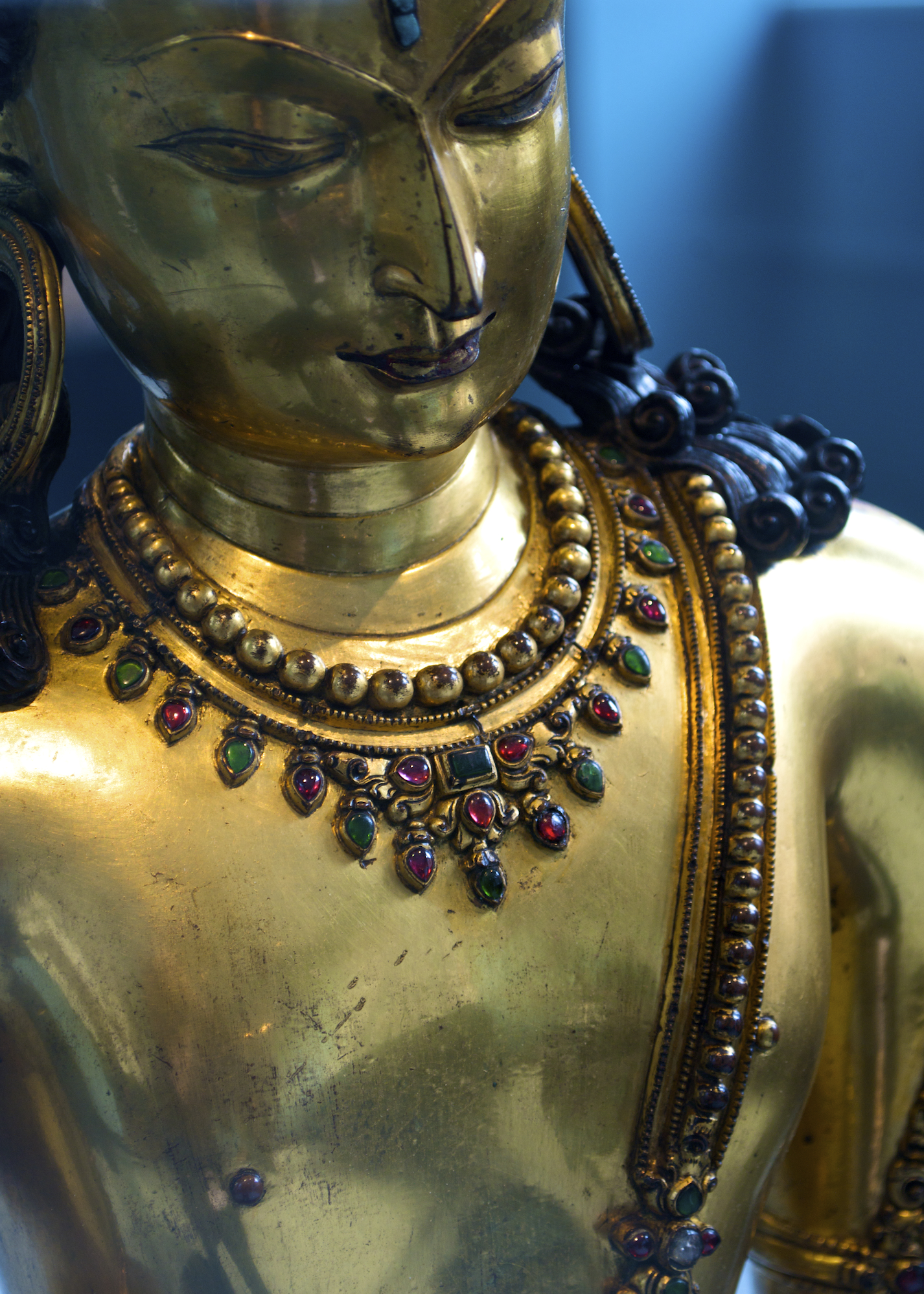
Left:Malla statue in Patan. Right:Bodhissatva Avalokiteshvara statue. Dated 1300–1400. Malla Dynasty.

Khasa Mall kings ruled in western Nepal during 1100–1484. However, Arimalla, first monarch of the Malla Dynasty, ruled in Kathmandu Valley from 1200 to 1216. Other notable rulers of the Malla dynasty were Jayasthitimalla who ruled as king of united Malla kingdom from 1382 to 1395 and Yakshamalla reigned from 1428 to 1482 at the height of united Malla kingdom.

The Malla dynasty period (1200–1768) witnessed further boost in enhancing the cultural heritage of Kathmandu by building pagodas, houses decorated with carved windows, exquisite open-air shrines and courtyards filled with brilliant sculptures. Kathmandu became a larger city and as observed by Father Giuseppe, a Capuchin missionary, in the 1760s, 'Catmandu' contained about 18,000 houses. During the 14th century, the dynasty was threatened and Kathmandu was subject to many attacks by outside invaders. In 1312, the Khasa king Ripumalla lead a raid in the Kathmandu Valley and in 1345–46 Sultan Shams ud-din Ilyas of Bengal invaded the city, and the Mughals left long lasting damage, destroying many earlier buildings and settlements which led to widespread reconstruction of the city. In 1484, the Malla kingdom divided into the three kingdoms of Kathmandu, Bhadgaon, and Patan.

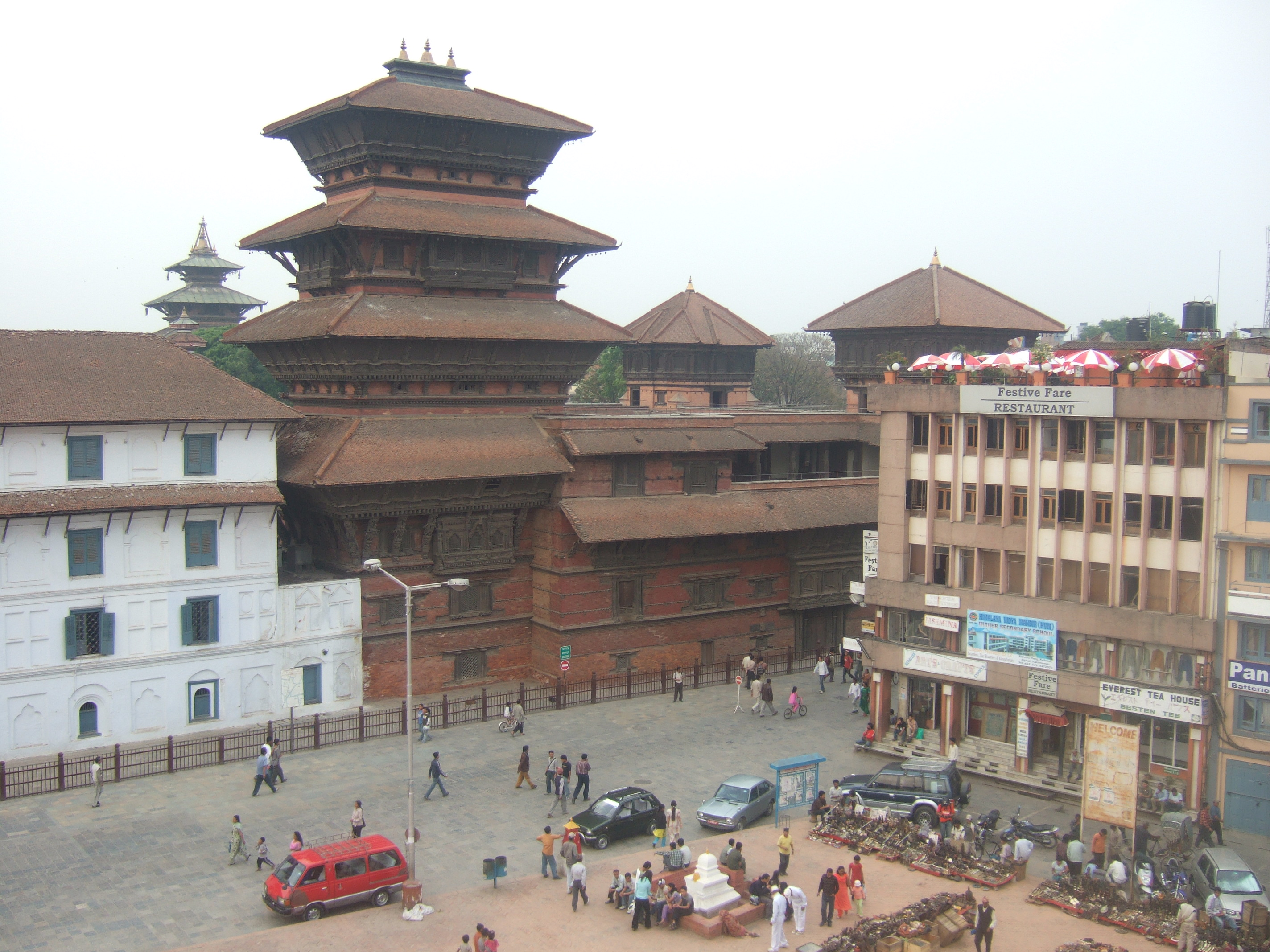
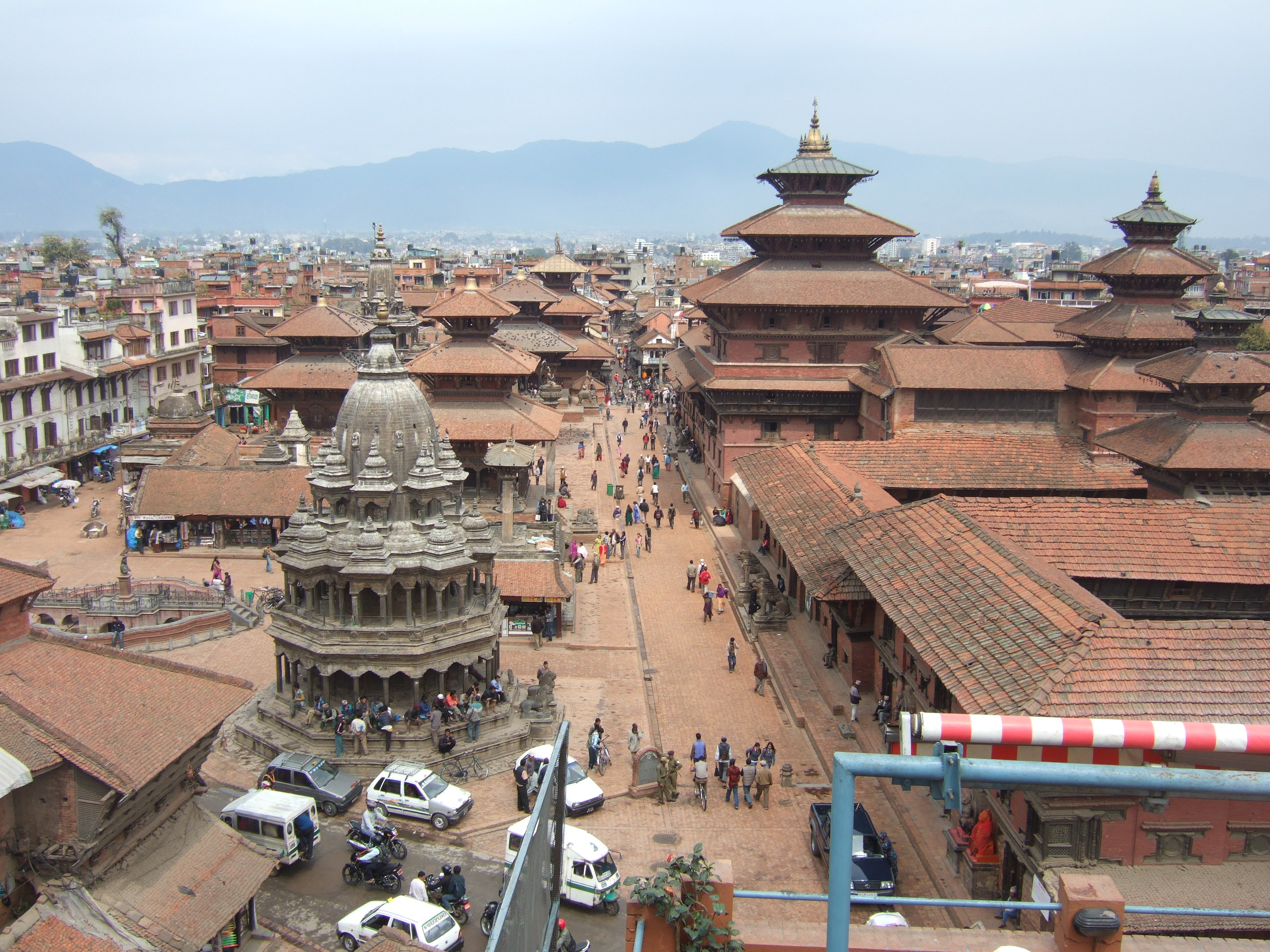
Left:Old palace of the rulers of the Malla dynasty. Right: Royal palace of Patan.

Early modern Nepal began its evolution in the 16th century with the founding of the House of Gorkha by Dravya Shah in 1559. During the rule of the Gorkhas there was further frenzied activity in building up the city. Ram Shah of Gorkha reigned from 1606 to 1633 and started expanding the Gorkha kingdom.

Kings such as Jitamitra Malla, King of Bhaktapur from 1673 to 1696 was noted in particular for his construction projects. In 1674, he built a Shikara-style Shiva temple with a gilded repousse mask of the God on each side in Bhaktapu. In 1682 he built, near the Durbar square, the two-storied Dharmasala Palace in which there is a golden Mahadeva. The palace was used by royalty until 1769 and today is a museum and part of the World Heritage Site on Durbar Square. To the east of this he erected the temple and statue of Narayana, along with the temples of Dattatrikasa and Pashupati. An inscription in 1678 states that he built the royal palace Thanathu Durbar, its gardens and courtyard. Jitamitra was also credited with restoring Kumari Chowk, the images of Astamatrikas and in 1690, donated two large copper kettledrums (nagara) or bells to his favourite deity, the goddess Taleju for the gilded roof of Taleju. He also contributed a finely carved wooden tympanum above the main entrance to the Mul Chowk and also erected many memorials in Bhaktapur.

His son, Bhupatindra Malla replaced him after his death in 1696 and was equally as fascinated with architecture, and continued the development of the Dharmsala Palace, its 55 windows and gardens.

== 1769–1845 ==
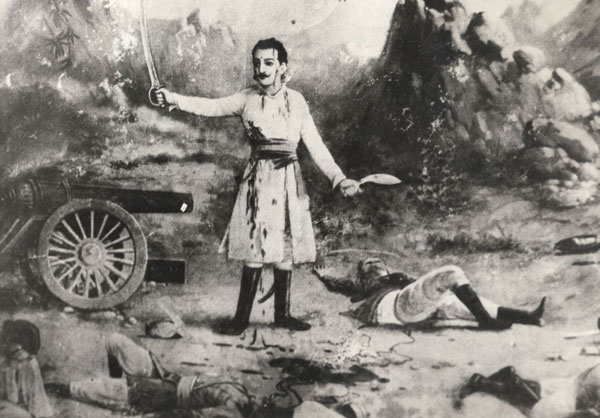
Balbhadra Kunwar, Gurkha commander of the Anglo-Nepalese War.

After Jayayakshya Malla conquered lands that was far larger than what Nepal had been before him, he decided to create a confederation for his sons so that they could rule the nation more efficiently. The Malla confederacy, with more than one ruler overlooking the nation, was more stable than the monarchial rule before. So, the monarchs focussed more on trade, arts and literature than in developing the army. By the time Prithvi Narayan Shah had ascended to the throne of Gorkha in 1743. When Prithvi Narayan Shah first attacked Kirtipur, the combined army of Malla confederacy defeated him and killed Kalu Pandey, the Mul Kaji in the Battle of Kirtipur. Even after the conquest of Kirtipur and Kantipur in 1768 in the Battle of Kathmandu, the Malla confederacy fought from Bhaktapur, where, the rulers of all the three states of the Malla confederacy surrendered. By 1769 enabled Prithvi Narayan Shah, the king of Gorkha, to conquer the valley, forming the foundations for the modern Kingdom of Nepal. Finally Gorkha conquered Kathmandu and Patan, Bhadgaon, eastern Nepal, and western Nepal between 1768 and 1790. Prithvi Narayan Shah, the first king of united Nepal died in 1775.

In 1767, a request to the British for help by the traditional valley kings under threat from Gorkha expansion resulted in an ill-equipped and ill-prepared expedition numbering 2,500 led by Captain Kinloch. The expedition was a disaster; the Gorkha army easily overpowered those who had not succumbed to malaria or desertion. This ineffectual British force provided the Gorkhas with firearms and filled them with suspicion, causing some to underestimate their future opponents.

This conquest of the Kathmandu Valley was only the beginning of an explosion of Gorkha power throughout the region. The Gorkha armies had overrun all of eastern Nepal by 1773. Gorkha forces had also annexed some western portions of Sikkim and in 1788 seized their then capital Rabdentse. In the west, all rulers as far as the Kali River had submitted or been replaced by 1790. Farther west still, the Kumaon region and its capital Almora had also succumbed to the Gorkhas.

To the north however, aggressive raids into Tibet (concerning a long-standing dispute over trade and control of the mountain passes) forced the Chinese emperor in Peking to act. In 1792 he sent a huge army, expelling the Nepalese from Tibet to within 5 kilometres (3.1 mi) of their capital at Kathmandu. Acting regent Bahadur Shah, (Prithvi Naryan's son), appealed to the British Governor-General of India for help. Anxious to avoid confrontation with the Chinese, the British sent Captain Kirkpatrick as mediator, but before he arrived the war with China had finished. The Nepalese were forced into signing a humiliating treaty revoking their trading privileges in Tibet and requiring them to pay tribute to Peking every five years.

The Tibet affair had postponed a previously planned attack on the Garhwal Kingdom, but by 1803 Raja of Garhwal Pradyuman Shah had also been defeated. He was killed in the struggle in January 1804, and all his land annexed. Further west, general Amar Singh Thapa overran lands as far as the Kangra – the strongest fort in the hill region – and laid siege to it (although by 1809, Ranjit Singh the ruler of the Sikh state in the Punjab, had intervened and driven the Nepalese army east of the Sutlej river). The British were also expanding their sphere of influence. The recent acquisition of the Nawab of Awadh's lands by the British East India Company brought the region of Gorakhpur into the close proximity of the raja of Palpa – the last remaining independent town within the Gorkha heartlands. Suspicion of the raja's collusion with the British led first to his imprisonment by the Gorkhas, then to his assassination. Bhimsen Thapa, Nepalese Prime Minister from 1806 to 1837, installed his own father as governor of Palpa, leading to serious border disputes between the two powers.

These disputes arose because there was no fixed boundary separating the Gorkhas and the British. A border commission imposed on Nepal by the Governor-General failed to solve the problem. Gorkha raids into the flatlands of the Tarai, a much prized strip of fertile ground separating the Nepalese hill country from India, increased tensions – the British felt their power in the region and their tenuous lines of communication between Calcutta and the northwest were under threat. Since there was no clear border, confrontation between the powers was inevitable.

As a result of border tensions and ambitious expansionism conflict came to heads in the Anglo-Nepalese War of 1814–1816 between the Kingdom of Nepal (now Federal Democratic Republic of Nepal) and the British East India Company. After the successful initial campaign by Ochterlony, however, the Kathmandu durbar failed to ratify the peace agreement signed on 28 November 1815. This reluctance to sign soon led to the second campaign. Unsurprisingly, Lord Moira placed Ochterlony in command of the 20,000 strong invasion force of Nepal.

After the decisive Battle of Makwanpur on 28 February 1816 and the fall of the fort of Hariharpur, the Gurkhas were forced to surrender and as a result the Treaty of Sugauli was ratified on 4 March 1816. Nepal lost Sikkim, the territories of Kumaon and Garhwal, and most of the lands of the Tarai; the British East India Company would pay 200,000 rupees annually to compensate for the loss of income from the Tarai region. However, the Tarai lands had proved difficult to govern and some of them were returned to Nepal later in 1816 and the annual payments abolished.

The Mechi river became the new eastern border and the Mahakali river the western boundary of Nepal. Kathmandu was also forced to accept a British Resident, a position that was loathed as it was seen as a symbol of its reduction to client status in relation to the British administration in Calcutta under the British Raj.

== Modern history (1846–1999) ==
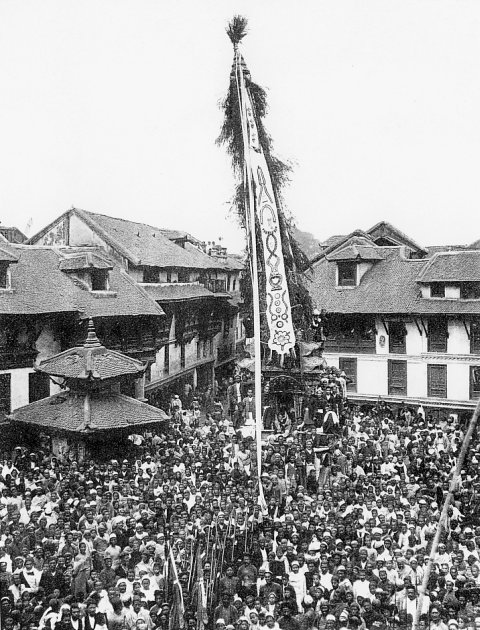
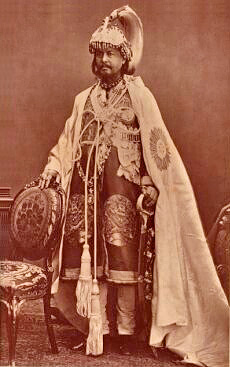
Left:Chariot procession or Jatra of Janabahadya in Kathmandu in the late 19th century. Right:Prime Minister Jang Bahadur in 1877.

With the Shahs establishing their rule over the Gorkhas, dictatorship ensued, with Ranas becoming all powerful. Jang Bahadur Kunwar was the first Prime Minister in 1846 followed by succession of Rana prime ministers, which lasted till 1950. Rana rule from Kathmandu was mainly governance by a landed aristocracy, with the parliamentary government functioning only as a facade. Even though there was stability in the country, political and economic development was on the backburner with the Ranas adopting isolation of the country with absolute total control over domestic affairs. All this was possible because of support of the army.

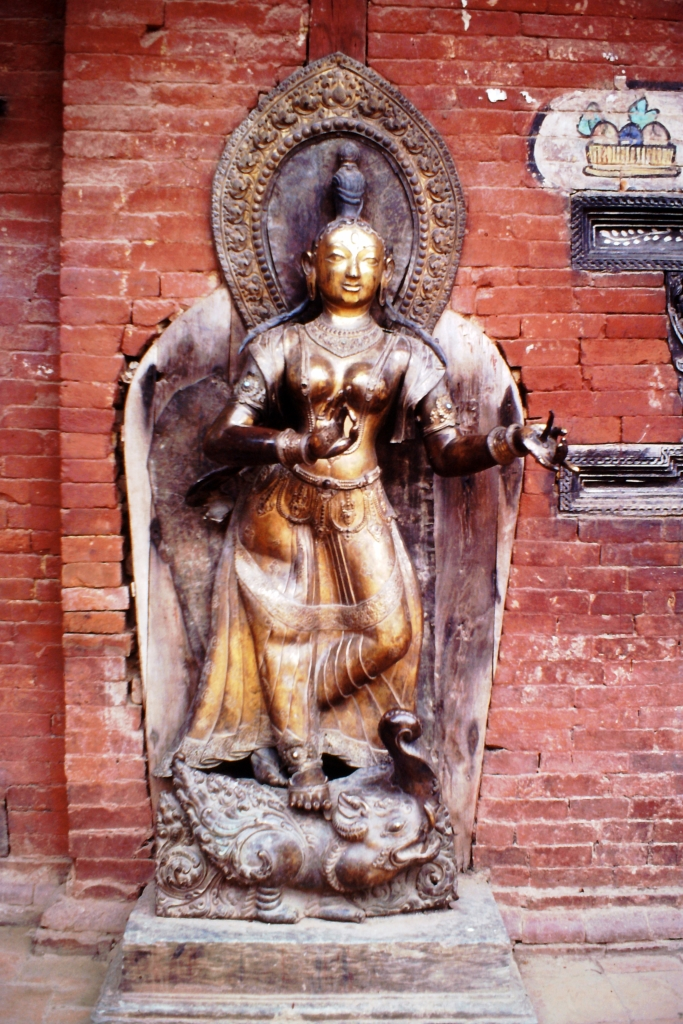
Statue of Ganga standing on Makara, in Mul Chowk, Lalitpur, Nepal, 1979

During all this period, Shahs as Monarchs were figurehead monarchs, while the real power rested with the Ranas. The Nepali Congress Party was founded in 1946, diplomatic relatshionship was established with USA and. In 1948 the country's first constitution, the Government of Nepal Act, was promulgated. But Prime Minister Padma Shamsher Rana resigned in the wake of opposition to the new constitution from conservative Ranas and Mohan Shamsher becomes prime minister; constitution is suspended. By 1950 Ranas fell into open conflict with King Tribhuvan as they suspected Nepali Congress Party's conspiracy against Rana power was instigated by the King. The king then sought and was granted asylum in India. at this stage, Government troops rebelled and over 140 Ranas joined the dissidents. During this period a Treaty of Peace and Friendship and Treaty of Trade and Commerce was signed with India.

The 1934 Nepal–Bihar earthquake damaged many parts of the city. However, they were later rebuilt to their original form. From the 1980s, the city has witnessed a building boom with farmlands within the city limits getting converted into urban building developments with the old core area getting encircled by high-rise buildings of business houses, wide boulevards and upscale residential suburbs.

However, in January 1951, the tide turned in favour of monarchy of Shahs, when the Ranas were forced to surrender all executive powers: financial management, appointment of government officials, and command of the armed forces to the Monarchy. Mohan Shamsher capitulated and King Tribhuvan was restored to the throne. Several Prime Minsires took executive control ending with the king assumin direct rule.

Local elections to a municipal council were first held on 9 September 1953. Candidates nominated by the illegal Communist Party of Nepal got 50% of the total votes cast. Out of a total of 19 seats, six were won by communists, four by Nepali Congress, four by Praja Parisad, one by Gorkha Parishad and four by independents.

Amongst the elected communists was the chairman of the council, Janak Man Singh. However, his tenure became short. A jurisdictional dispute emerged between the municipal council and the national government. A no-confidence vote removed Singh from his office and the national government banned him from entering the municipal council office. Singh was arrested when attempting to enter the office, and was jailed.

Following the death of King Tribhuvan in 1955, Mahendra assumed power.[15] During this period Nepal joined the United Nations, National Police Force was formed, In the 1950s many events occurred such as the signing of border treaty with China, the USSR opening an embassy at Kathmandu and the United States opening an embassy at Kathmandu in 1959. A new constitution was also promulgated in 1959, superseding Constitution of 1951. The first general elections were also held in 1956 with the Nepal Congress Party winning absolute majority; and the Tribhuvan University was founded.

In December 1960, King Mahendra abolished the multiparty democracy and brought in the Panchayat Raj into force. This was fully controlled by the Monarchy. In 1962, King Mahendra adopted a new constitution, the third since 1951, and established the centrally controlled partyless council system of governance called panchayat. This system served as the institutional basis of the king's rule. The palace claimed it a democratic administration although it functioned only at the king's behest. It was then established at the village, district, and national levels. Even with successive changes in executive wing of government in Kathmandu and constitutional revisions, the absolute powers of the monarchy remained solid. Land Reorganization Act and Mulki Ain, new legal code, were also promulgated.

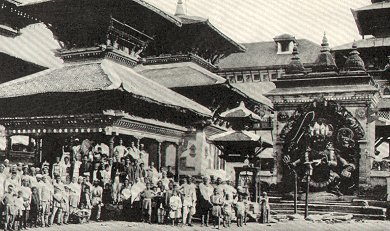
Durbar Square in 1920

But political unrest simmered as the events testify: In 1963 after Emergency was lifted Panchayat elections were held and the National Guidance Council was formed. In 1965, the local government was reorganized. In 1971 a new trade and transit treaty was negotiated with India from Kathmandu.

In 1972 King Mahedra died and was succeeded by King Birendra. Development regions were established under National Development Council.[15] But a fire in the same year burns down Singha Durbar, the seat of government. King Birendra was crowned in 1973. He soon thereafter launched the "Go to the Village".

Houses in Kathmandu in 1988

In the May 1980 referendum while reaffirming the status quo of the panchayat system, against the reintroduction of political parties and concurred continuation rule by the king. Elections in 1981 and 1986 were characterized by the lack of political programs. Political turmoil continued. Second election to Rastriya Panchayat were held in 1986; [15] In 1989, failure to renegotiate trade and transit treaties with India disrupted the economy. Following this in 1990 demonstrations for the restoration of democracy were held. On 9 April 1990, the King restored the multi-party democracy with due lifting of the ban on agitating political parties. Panchayat system was dissolved and an interim government made up of various parties and king's representatives was formed with promulgation of new constitution.

Following restoration of multi-party democracy, the first general elections to Parliament were held on 12 May 1991, under the new constitution. Nepali Congress won a narrow majority and G.P. Koirala became prime minister. But President of Nepali Congress and interim prime minister, K.P. Bhattarai, was defeated in the polls by the leader of CPN-UML, Madan Bhandari.

In 1992 Local elections were held and Nepali Congress won a majority of the seats. But in 1993 Madan Bhandari was killed in a mysterious car crash which resulted in violent demonstrations by communists to overthrow Koirala's government. During this year, devastating floods also killed hundreds.

== Contemporary history (2000–present) ==
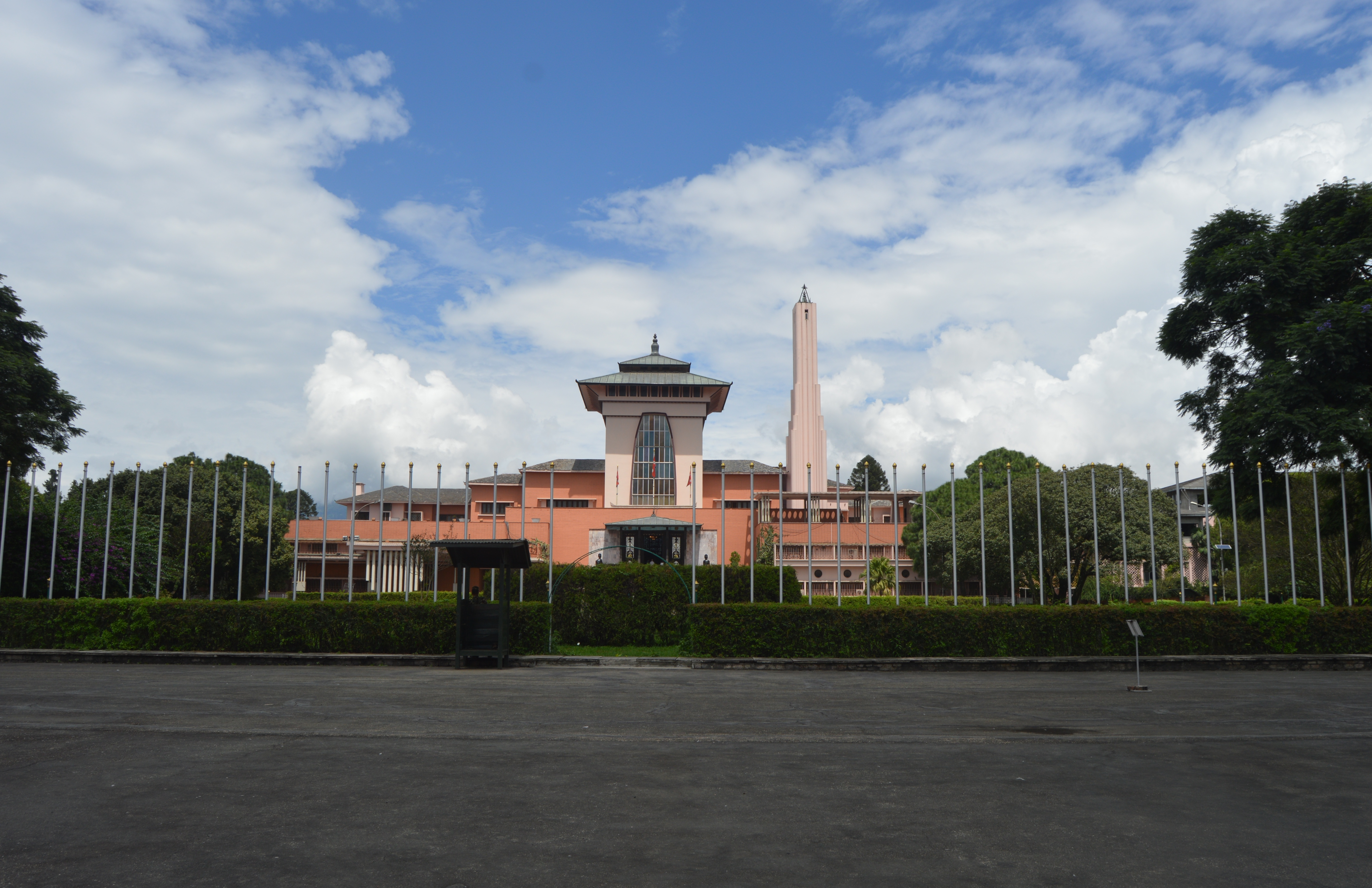
The Narayanhiti Palace, where the royal massacre occurred

In recent years, Kathmandu has experienced a turbulent history and political instability, marred by outbreaks of violence and protests, which have often caused considerable damage to buildings or caused loss of lives. On 1 June 2001, a gruesome royal massacre occurred when the Crown Prince Dipendra gunned down his immediate family consisting of his father King Birendra, his mother Queen Aishvarya, his brother and sister, and also five of his relatives at the Narayanhiti Royal Palace. He turned the gun on himself and died two days later. The reason for this massacre is shrouded in mystery but his love for the Rana family girl Devyani Rana, which was not acceptable to his parents, is conjectured as the reason for this massacre. Following this tragedy, King Gyanendra, brother of deceased King Birendra was crowned the king at the palace. The Tribhuvan Sadan where the massacre took place was subsequently demolished at the orders of the Queen mother.

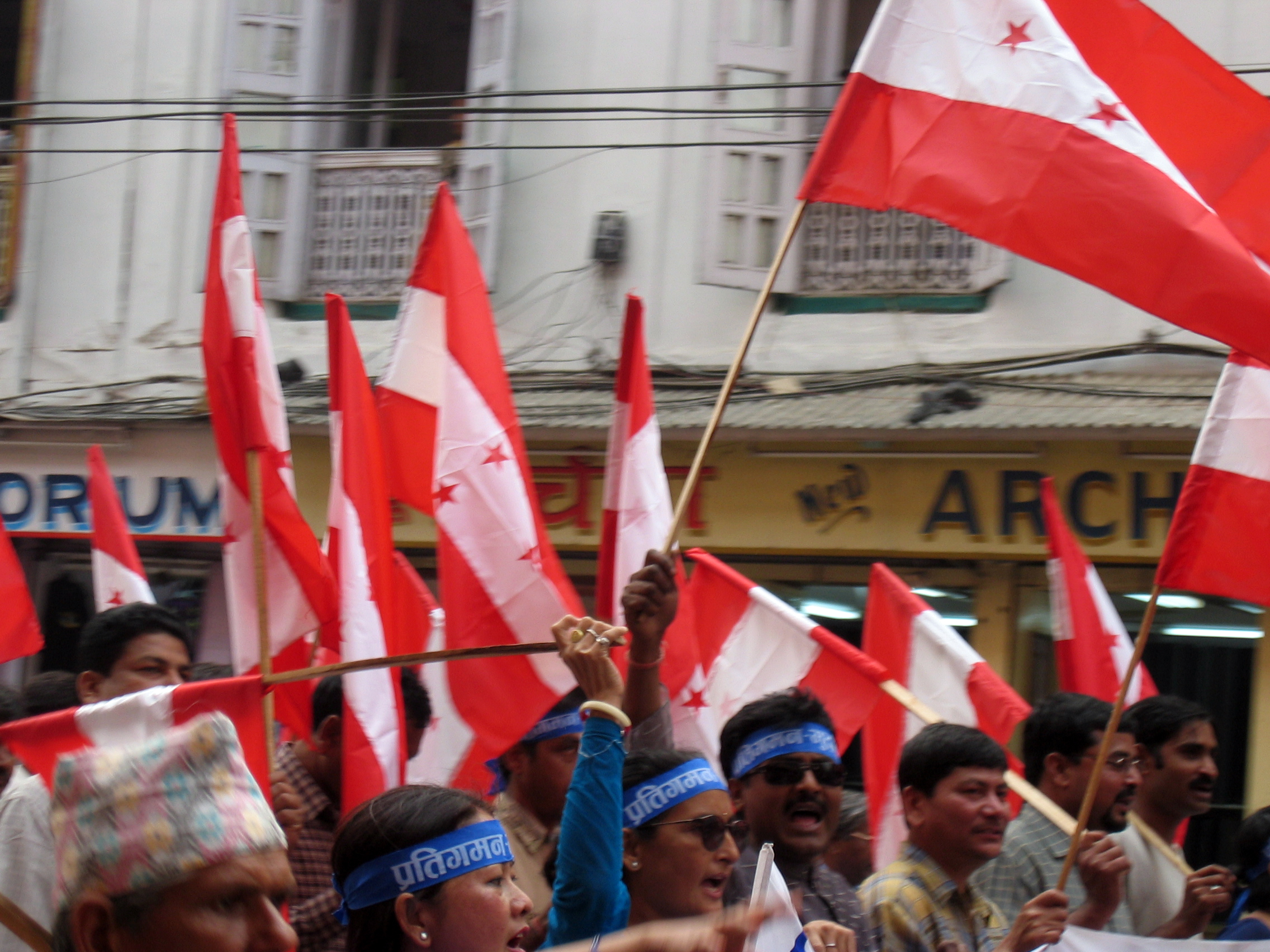
Demonstration in Kathmandu in April 2004

In April 2004, a mob of some 4,000 people, mainly youths, expressed anger at the killing of 12 Nepalese jobseekers in Iraq, and burned down and vandalised many buildings, including more than a dozen private employment agencies and the city's Jama Masjid Mosque. In summer 2008, Kathmandu reached global headlines when political protests capitulated and political protests have plagued the city ever since.

In November 2009, protests by Communist Party of Nepal (Maoist ) rebels have continued, following the collapse of the Maoist-led government in May 2009, have demanded a referendum in parliament about the extent of presidential powers, and accusing the head of the army of opposing the integration of thousands of former Maoist rebels into the national army. The demonstrators blocked the entrances to the main government complex and caused traffic chaos, protesting with slogans such as "Down with the puppet government" and waving Maoist flags.

The city was severely damaged by a 7.8 magnitude earthquake in April 2015. Some buildings have been restored while some remain in the process of reconstruction.

Due to the rising demand of luxury apartments many high rise complexes are being built. Kathmandu Metropolitan City office granted a construction license to over a thousand builders from within and outside the country to build residential complexes. Kathmandu's Vertical Limit

The city of Kathmandu at dusk, on an evening in Tihar 2010.

== See also ==
- Battle of Kathmandu
- Battle of Kirtipur
- Battle of Lalitpur
- Battle of Bhaktapur
- Timeline of Kathmandu

== Bibliography ==
- von Schroeder, Ulrich. 2019. Nepalese Stone Sculptures. Volume One: Hindu; Volume Two: Buddhist. (Visual Dharma Publications). ISBN 978-3-033-06381-5. Contains SD card with 15,000 digital photographs of Nepalese sculptures and other subjects as public domain.
