= Narendradeva (Thakuri dynasty) =

12th-century King of Nepal

King of Nepal
- Reign: 1140–1147
- Predecessor: Manadeva
- Successor: Aanandadeva
- Dynasty: Thakuri
- Religion: Hinduism

Narendradeva (Nepali: नरेन्द्रदेव) was a Thakuri king of Nepal who reigned from c. 1140–1147.

== Life ==
Narendradeva was a brother of Indradeva. Indradeva had ruled from c. 1126 instead of the then heir apparent, Mahendradeva, a son of Simhadeva. Narendradeva started as a governor of Bhadgaon during the reign of Indradeva. He kept that position until Indradeva's son Manadeva died. Manadeva had no children and Narendradeva succeeded his nephew as the king.

Narendradeva did not have any legitimate heirs and was succeeded by Aanandadeva, a son of Simhadeva, in 1147.

== Bibliography ==
- Petech, Luciano (1984). Medieval History of Nepal (PDF) (2nd ed.). Italy: Fondata Da Giuseppe Tucci.
- Regmi, D.R. (1965). Medieval Nepal. Part I (Early Medieval Period 750–1530 A.D.) (PDF). Calcutta: Firma K.L. Mukhopadhyay.
- Shaha, Rishikesh (1990). Ancient and Medieval Nepal (PDF). Kathmandu, Nepal: University of Cambridge.
- Regmi, Mahesh C. (1971). "Regmi Research Series" (PDF). German Oriental Society. 3.

Preceded by Manadeva	King of Nepal; 1140–1147	Succeeded by Aanandadeva
