= Gunakamadeva =

10th-century Thakuri ruler of Nepal

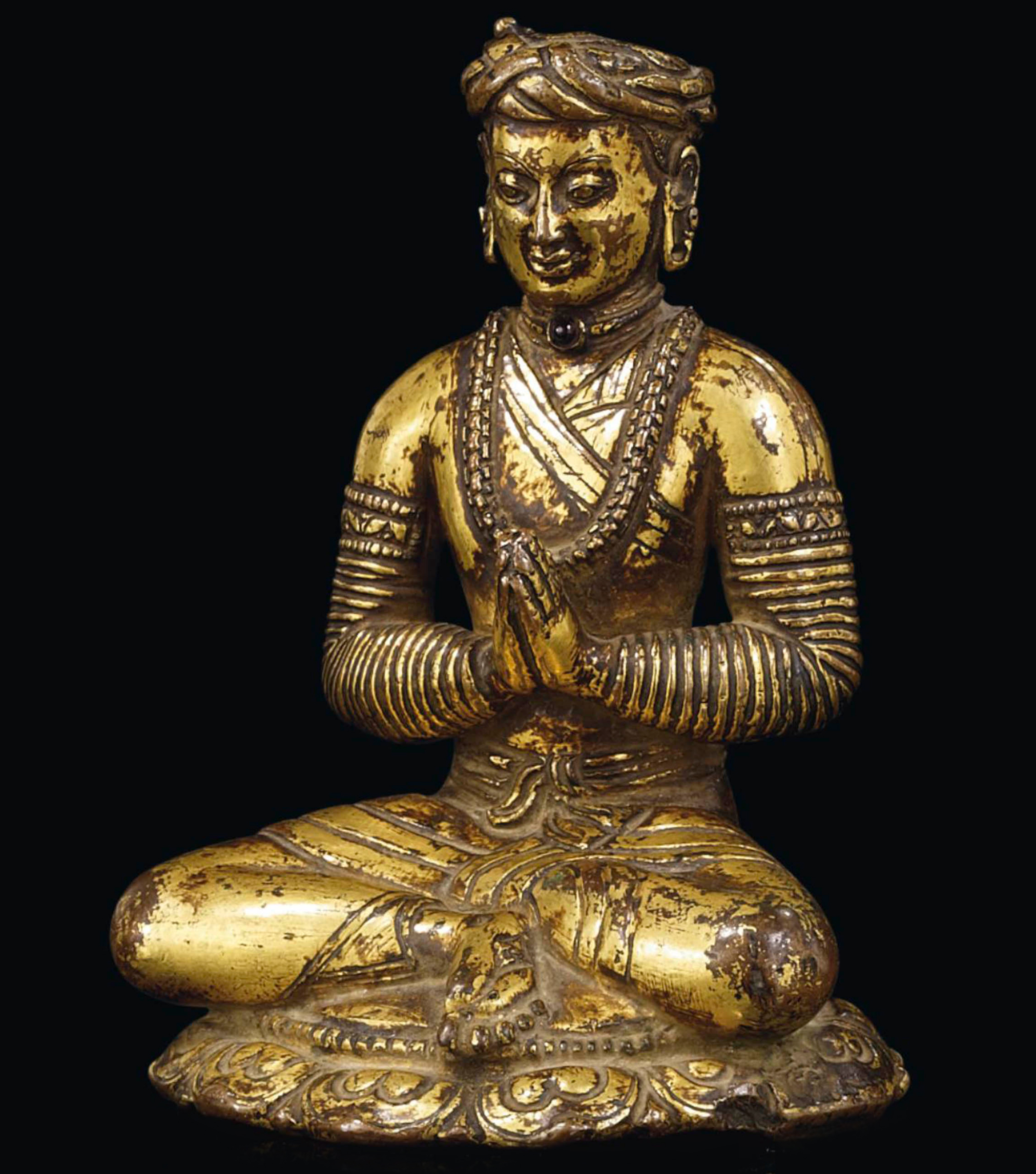
- c.12th century image of Gunakamadeva

King of Nepal
- Reign: c. 949–994
- Predecessor: Vikramadeva
- Successor: Udaydeva
- Dynasty: Thakuri
- Religion: Hinduism

Gunakamadeva was a Thakuri ruler credited with the founding of Kathmandu. He ruled from around 949 to 994 CE.

== Life ==
He is also credited to have started Yenya and Lakhey Jatra. He was known for his tantric abilities which was demonstrated by him entering Shantipur in Swayambhunath. During his rule, he renovated Pashupatinath temple, Raktakali temple, Kankeshwari temple and Panchalinga Bhairav temple.

Gunakamadeva is credited with founding Kathmandu. With the development of cities, he transformed agrarian society to an industrial city trading between India and Tibet.

He was succeeded by Udayadeva.

== See also ==
- History of Kathmandu

Preceded by Vikramadeva	King of Nepal; 949–994	Succeeded by Udaydeva
