= Nirbhayadeva =

11th-century King of Nepal

King of Nepal
- Reign: 1004–1009
- Predecessor: Udaydeva
- Successor: Rudradeva
- Co-ruler: Rudradeva (1007–1009)
- Dynasty: Thakuri
- Religion: Hinduism

Nirbhayadeva (Nepali: निर्भयदेव) was a Thakuri king of Nepal who reigned from c. 1004–1009.

== Reign ==
Nirbhayadeva became the king after succeeding Udaydeva in c. 1004. In around 1007, he was reduced to the status of a co-ruler by Rudradeva, and the next year, his reign ceased. Rudradeva and his nephew Bhojadeva ruled jointly after then. He died a few years later.

== Bibliography ==
- Petech, Luciano (1984). Medieval History of Nepal (PDF) (2nd ed.). Italy: Fondata Da Giuseppe Tucci.
- Regmi, D.R. (1965). Medieval Nepal. Lucknow: Firma K.L. Mukhopadhyay.
- Shaha, Rishikesh (1990). Ancient and Medieval Nepal (PDF). Kathmandu, Nepal: University of Cambridge. Archived from the original (PDF) on 2024-12-03.

Preceded by Udaydeva	King of Nepal; 1004–1009; With: Rudradeva (1007–1009)	Succeeded by Rudradeva
