= Rudradeva II (Thakuri dynasty) =

12th-century King of Nepal

Rudradeva

King of Nepal
- Reign: 20 January 1167–1175
- Predecessor: Aanandadeva
- Successor: Amritadeva
- Died: 1175
- Dynasty: Thakuri
- Father: Simhadeva
- Religion: Hinduism

Rudradeva II (Nepali: रुद्रदेव) was a son of Simhadeva and a Thakuri king of Nepal who reigned from 1167–1175.

== Life ==
Rudradeva was the third son of Simhadeva and a younger brother of the preceding monarch Aanandadeva. He succeeded Aanandadeva after the former's death in 1175 at a late age. His reign was generally peaceful and, unlike his predecessors', the feudal lords did not incite any riots and conflicts.

Rudradeva had assumed the throne despite the existence of a legitimate heir, i.e. Aanandadeva's son. Historians generally agree that the three sons of Simhadeva had an agreement to share the throne in succession among themselves after the death of Mahindradeva, their eldest brother. Following the agreement, Rudradeva's younger brother Amritadeva succeeded him after his death in 1175.

== Bibliography ==
- Petech, Luciano (1984). Medieval History of Nepal (PDF) (2nd ed.). Italy: Fondata Da Giuseppe Tucci.
- Regmi, D.R. (1965). Medieval Nepal. Part I (Early Medieval Period 750–1530 A.D.) (PDF). Calcutta: Firma K.L. Mukhopadhyay.
- Shaha, Rishikesh (1990). Ancient and Medieval Nepal (PDF). Kathmandu, Nepal: University of Cambridge.
- Regmi, Mahesh C. (1971). "Regmi Research Series" (PDF). German Oriental Society. 3.

Preceded by Aanandadeva	King of Nepal; 20 January 1167–1175	Succeeded by Amritadeva
