= Aanandadeva =

12th-century King of Nepal

King of Nepal
- Reign: 19 January 1147–1167
- Predecessor: Narendradeva
- Successor: Rudradeva II
- Born: 11 May 1099
- Died: 1167 (aged 67–68)
- Dynasty: Thakuri
- Father: Simhadeva
- Religion: Hinduism

Aanandadeva (Nepali: आनन्ददेव) was a son of Simhadeva and a Thakuri king of Nepal who reigned from c. 1147–1167.

== Life ==
Aanandadeva was the second son of Simhadeva (r. 1098–1126). Instead of Mahindradeva, the eldest son of Simhadeva, Indradeva from another Thakuri lineage had ousted and succeeded Simhadeva. Since Narendradeva, Aanandadeva's predecessor and Indradeva's brother, had no legitimate heirs, the lineage of Simhadeva was revived by Aanandadeva.

Even before Aanandadeva became the king, he held an influential position in the palace and thus his ascension, that replaced Indradeva's dynasty, did not meet any restrain. However, during the initial period of his reign, he had troubles suppressing the feudal lords who were declaring themselves independent from the monarchy.

Aanandadeva was regarded highly by his subjects and he had a generally peaceful reign. He had no any legitimate heirs, and was succeeded by his younger brother Rudradeva II after his death in 1167. His death followed a period of political instability and rapidly changing successions that became a catalyst for the eventual downfall of Thakuri dynasty, and the rise of the Mallas in c. 1200.

== Bibliography ==
- Petech, Luciano (1984). Medieval History of Nepal (PDF) (2nd ed.). Italy: Fondata Da Giuseppe Tucci.
- Regmi, D.R. (1965). Medieval Nepal. Part I (Early Medieval Period 750–1530 A.D.) (PDF). Calcutta: Firma K.L. Mukhopadhyay.
- Shaha, Rishikesh (1990). Ancient and Medieval Nepal (PDF). Kathmandu, Nepal: University of Cambridge.
- Regmi, Mahesh C. (1971). "Regmi Research Series" (PDF). German Oriental Society. 3.

Preceded by Narendradeva	King of Nepal; 19 January 1147–1167	Succeeded by Rudradeva II
