= Ajima =

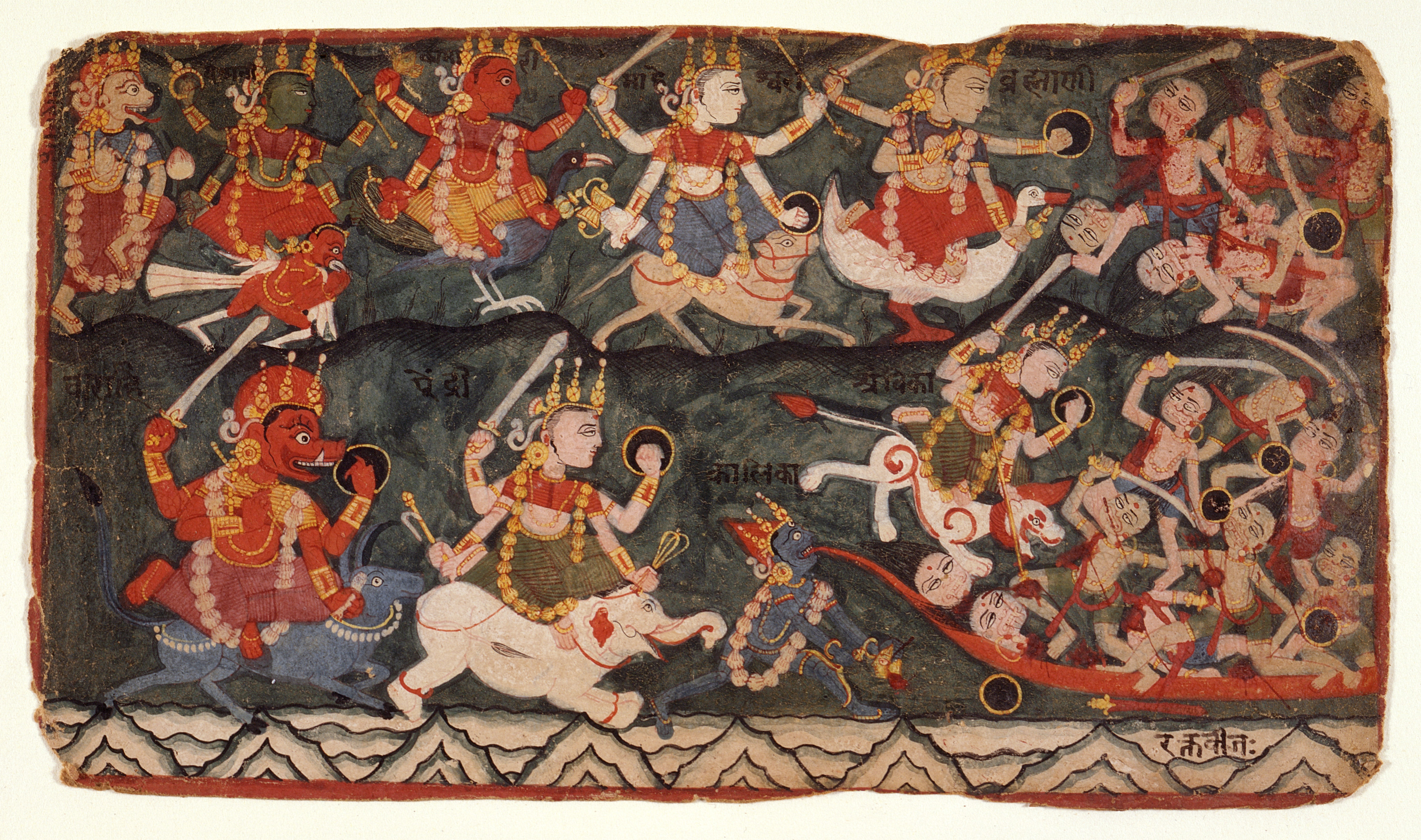
The eight Ajimas of Kathmandu are also worshipped as Asthamatrika

Ajima (Nepal Bhasa:अजिमा) is a group of goddesses of the Newar pantheon. These goddesses are respected by all sects and castes of Newars, both from Hindu and Buddhist religion. If we look Ajimas from sky, they look like a sword. So, it is said that the Ajimas protect Kathmandu Valley.

== Etymology ==
The word "Ajima" comes from two Nepal Bhasa words, "Aji" meaning grandmother and "Ma" meaning mother. This deity represents all the female ancestors of Newar who have been deified under the influence of the Shaktism branch of Hinduism and Vajrayana Buddhism.

== History ==
Newar society was a matriarchial society initially. During that era, Ajimas were the most respected deities. Even after the addition of other indigenous deities e.g.-Majipa Lakhey, Lokeshwars (e.g.-Janabahadya), Kumari and other deities of Hindu and Buddhist religions, the deity is still considered of primary importance by Newars.

== Influence ==
These deities are revered by both Hindus and Buddhists. She is regarded as the protector of children as well. The core city of Kathmandu (which was the city built by planners of Gunakamdev, the founder of Kathmandu), has eight Ajima temples strategically situated at the peripheries of the city. These temples of Ajima used to contain army barracks (the army headquarters is still at the side of Lunmari Ajima a.k.a. Bhadrakali). So, these Ajima temples are believed to be protectors of cities as well.

The eight Ajimas or Astha Matrika (eight matriarchs) of Kathmandu are as follows-

- Pasikwa Ajima/ Brahmayani (Kamalādī, behind Tīndhārā Pāṭhśālā)
- Lunmari Ajima/ Bhadrakali
- Fibwa Ajima/ varahi
- Nai Ajima/ Vaishnavi (Pacalī)
- Kanga Ajima/ Chamunda
- Lunti Ajima/ Indrayani
- Thanbahi Ajima/ Jati Ajima /Thamel
- Chandralakhu Ajima/ Mahalaxmi
- Phisa Ajima/ Mhepi ajima (Panga)/ maheswari or Rudrayani

== See also ==
- Newar
- Nepal Bhasa
- Kathmandu
- Kathmandu Metropolitan City
