= Vamadeva (Thakuri dynasty) =

11th-century King of Nepal

King of Nepal
- Reign: 1083–1085
- Predecessor: Shankaradeva
- Successor: Harshadeva
- Dynasty: Thakuri
- Religion: Hinduism

Vamadeva (Nepali: बामदेव) was a Thakuri king of Nepal who reigned from c. 1083–1085.

== Life ==
Vamadeva was a descendant of Amshuverma belonging to the Vaishya Thakuris. In c. 1083, Vamadeva, along with the help of Thakuris of Patan and Jivas of Udaypur, dethroned Shankaradeva and made himself the king. It is believed that a similar act was performed with the ancestors of Vamadeva by Bhaskaradeva, an ancestor of the preceding monarch.

He had short reign of around two years and was succeeded by Harshadeva in c. 1085.

== Bibliography ==
- Petech, Luciano (1984). Medieval History of Nepal (PDF) (2nd ed.). Italy: Fondata Da Giuseppe Tucci.
- Regmi, D.R. (1965). Medieval Nepal. Part I (Early Medieval Period 750–1530 A.D.) (PDF). Calcutta: Firma K.L. Mukhopadhyay.
- Shaha, Rishikesh (1990). Ancient and Medieval Nepal (PDF). Kathmandu, Nepal: University of Cambridge.
- Regmi, Mahesh C. (1971). "Regmi Research Series" (PDF). German Oriental Society. 3.

| Preceded by Shankaradeva | King of Nepal; 1083–1085 | Succeeded by Harshadeva |
