= Timeline of Kathmandu =

List of Important Events in the History of Kathmandu City

The following is a timeline of the history of the city of Kathmandu, Nepal.

== Prior to 20th century ==
- 1567 BCE – Kirant rule started
- 1000 BCE – Swayambhunath shrine built (approximate date).
- 723 CE – Kathmandu founded by Raja Gunakamedeva.
- 1339 – Samasuddhin attacks Nepal and loots lot of jewels
- 1480 – Kathmandu becomes independent.
- 1596 – Temple of Kathmandu built.
- 1690 – Maju Deval built.
- 1768 – Battle of Kathmandu; city taken by Gurkha forces of Prithvi Narayan Shah.
- 1832 – Dharahara Tower built by Bhimsen Thapa.
- 1846 – Kot massacre.
- 1886 – Residence of royal family relocated from Hanuman Dhoka (Basantapur Palace) to Narayanhity Palace (now a museum).

== 20th century ==
- 1901 – Gorkhapatra newspaper begins publication.
- 1920
  - Garden of Dreams built for Kaiser Shamsher Jang Bahadur Rana.
  - Population: 108,805 metro.
- 1934 – 1934 Nepal–India earthquake.
- 1954 – Nepali Hindi Daily newspaper begins publication.
- 1956 – Central Zoo opens.
- 1959 – Tribhuvan University founded in nearby Kirtipur.
- 1961
  - Janasewa Cinema burns down on New Road.
  - Population: 122,507.
- 1967 – National Museum of Nepal active.
- 1970 – Narayanhity Palace rebuilt.

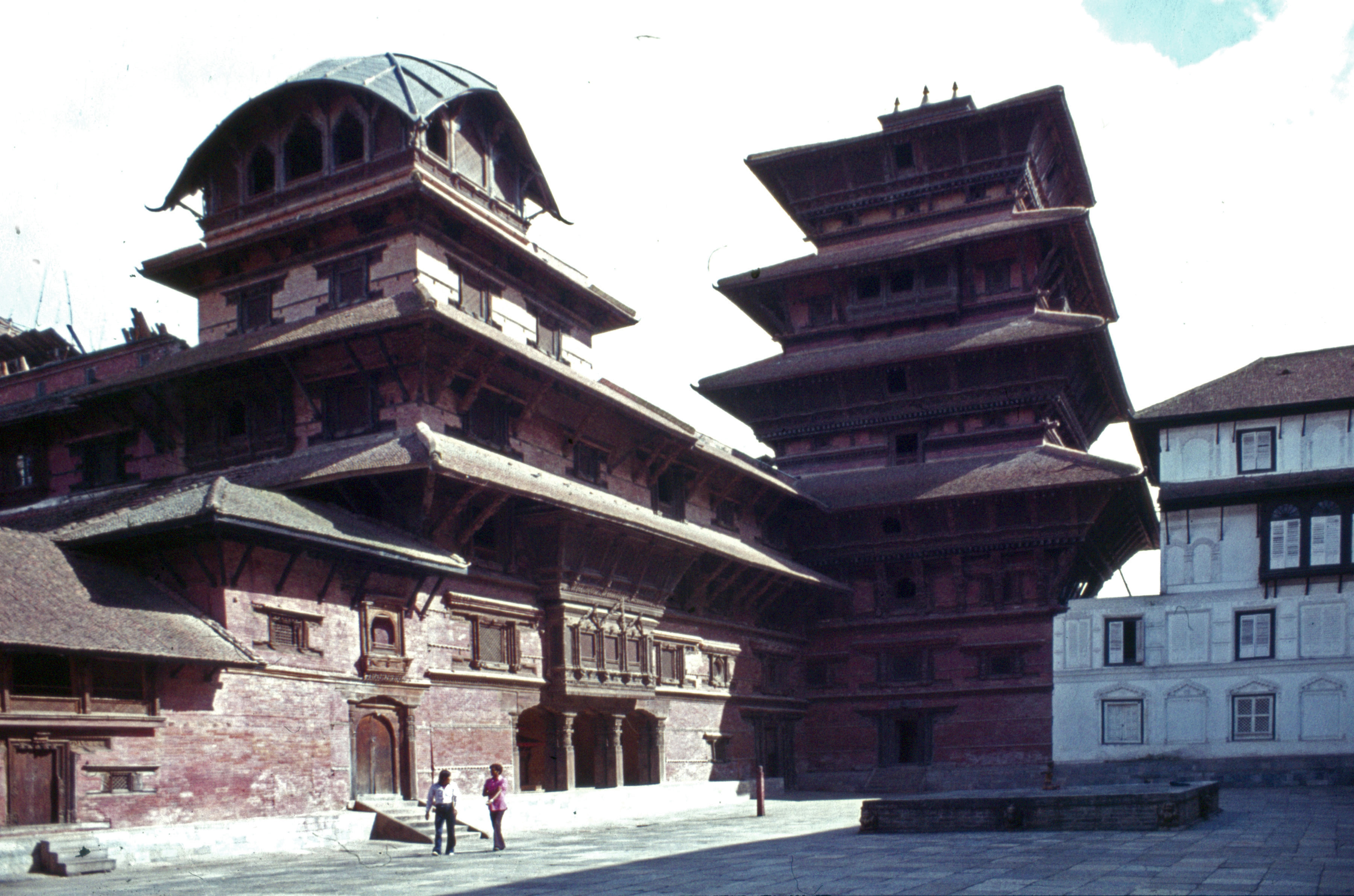
Hanuman Dhoka-Nasal Chowk 1976

- 1975
  - 24 February: Coronation of king Birendra.
  - Natural History Museum of Nepal established.
- 1979 – Kathmandu Valley UNESCO World Heritage Site established.
- 1981 – Population: 235,160.
- 1983 – Daily News English-language newspaper begins publication.
- 1992
  - April: Political demonstration; crackdown.
  - Nepal Stock Exchange established.
- 1994 – Center for Nepal Environmental and Educational Development established.

== 21st century ==
- 2001
  - 1 June: Nepalese royal massacre.
  - Population: 671,846 city; in 1,081,845 Kathmandu District.
- 2007
  - United Nations Mission in Nepal headquartered in Baneshwor.
  - September: Bombing.
- 2010 – September: 12th General Convention of the Nepali Congress held in Kathmandu.
- 2011 – Population: 1,003,285; 1,744,240 in Kathmandu District.
- 2015 – 25 April: The 7.8 M_{w} Ghorka earthquake affected the country with a maximum Mercalli intensity of IX (Violent). Almost 9,000 people were killed in the region.

== See also ==
- History of Kathmandu

== Bibliography ==
- Edward Balfour (1885), "Khatmandu", Cyclopaedia of India (3rd ed.), London: B. Quaritch, hdl:2027/mdp.39015068611014 – via HathiTrust
- Schellinger and Salkin, ed. (1996). "Kathmandu". International Dictionary of Historic Places: Asia and Oceania. UK: Routledge. p. 464+. ISBN 9781884964046.
- Urmi Sengupta (2011). "The divided city?: squatters' struggle for urban space in Kathmandu". In Jonathan Shapiro Anjaria and Colin McFarlane (ed.). Urban Navigations: Politics, Space and the City in South Asia. Routledge. ISBN 978-1-136-19742-0.
