= Amritadeva =

12th-century King of Nepal

King of Nepal
- Reign: c. 1175–1178
- Predecessor: Rudradeva II
- Successor: Somesvaradeva
- Born: 25 September 1113
- Died: 28 August 1179 (aged 65)
- Dynasty: Thakuri
- Father: Simhadeva
- Religion: Hinduism

Amritadeva (Nepali: अमृतदेव) was a son of Simhadeva and a Thakuri king of Nepal who reigned c. 1175–1178.

== Life ==
Amritadeva was the youngest son of Simhadeva and a brother of the preceding monarch Rudradeva II. Amritadeva succeeded his brother following an agreement to share the throne among his brothers instead of passing it down to the eldest son of the monarch.

Unlike his predecessor's, his reign was filled with chaos and turmoil. Nepal was struck by a great calamity and a famine had broken out. The cost of daily essentials, such as grain, had highly risen and the people suffered a lot. His reign marked the beginning of the fall of Thakuri dynasty.

Amritadeva was either deposed or he abdicated in favor of his nephew—the son of his eldest brother Mahindradeva—in 1178. He died the next year in 1179.

== Bibliography ==
- Petech, Luciano (1984). Medieval History of Nepal (PDF) (2nd ed.). Italy: Fondata Da Giuseppe Tucci.
- Regmi, D.R. (1965). Medieval Nepal. Part I (Early Medieval Period 750–1530 A.D.) (PDF). Calcutta: Firma K.L. Mukhopadhyay.
- Shaha, Rishikesh (1990). Ancient and Medieval Nepal (PDF). Kathmandu, Nepal: University of Cambridge.
- Regmi, Mahesh C. (1971). "Regmi Research Series" (PDF). German Oriental Society. 3.

Preceded by Rudradeva II	King of Nepal; 1175–1178	Succeeded by Somesvaradeva
