= Harshadeva =

11th-century King of Nepal

King of Nepal
- Reign: 1085–1098
- Predecessor: Vamadeva
- Successor: Simhadeva
- Dynasty: Thakuri
- Religion: Hinduism

Harshadeva (Nepali: हर्षदेव) was a Thakuri king of Nepal who reigned from c. 1085–1098.

== Life ==
Harshadeva succeeded Vamadeva in around c. 1085. Similar to his predecessor, he did not assume full royal titles. The reason for this is not clear with some authors hinting at a suzerainty of Nepal to a foreign kingdom.

The reign of Harshadeva was filled with distress and internal conflicts. Local lords of his kingdom constantly fought with each other and tried to proclaim themself as the king. The feudatories continued to exercise more control than the monarch even after Harshadeva's death for more than ten years.

Harshadeva was succeeded by Simhadeva after his death in 1098.

== Bibliography ==
- Petech, Luciano (1984). Medieval History of Nepal (PDF) (2nd ed.). Italy: Fondata Da Giuseppe Tucci.
- Regmi, D.R. (1965). Medieval Nepal. Part I (Early Medieval Period 750–1530 A.D.) (PDF). Calcutta: Firma K.L. Mukhopadhyay.
- Shaha, Rishikesh (1990). Ancient and Medieval Nepal (PDF). Kathmandu, Nepal: University of Cambridge.
- Regmi, Mahesh C. (1971). "Regmi Research Series" (PDF). German Oriental Society. 3.

Preceded by Vamadeva	King of Nepal; 1085–1098	Succeeded by Simhadeva
