= Rudradeva (Thakuri dynasty) =

11th-century King of Nepal

King of Nepal
- Reign: 1007–1030
- Predecessor: Nirbhayadeva
- Successor: Lakshmikamadeva
- Co-rulers: Lakshmikamadeva (1015–1030); Bhojadeva (1009–1020); Nirbhayadeva (1007–1009)
- Dynasty: Thakuri
- Religion: Hinduism

Nirbhayadeva (Nepali: रुद्रदेव) was a Thakuri king of Nepal who reigned from c. 1007–1030.

== Reign ==
Rudradeva started his reign as a co-ruler of Nirbhayadeva in 1008. The next year, Rudradeva started his joint rule with his grand-nephew Bhojadeva. and from around 1015, Lakshmikamadeva started ruling together with Rudradeva and Bhojadeva. The two monarchs reigned from Lalitpur while the former reigned from Kathmandu. Bhojadeva disappeared from the scene after this period.

Lakshmikamadeva was in a subordinate position to Rudradeva and after the latter's death in c. 1030, the former reigned as a sole ruler.

== Bibliography ==
- Petech, Luciano (1984). Medieval History of Nepal (PDF) (2nd ed.). Italy: Fondata Da Giuseppe Tucci.
- Regmi, D.R. (1965). Medieval Nepal. Lucknow: Firma K.L. Mukhopadhyay.
- Shaha, Rishikesh (1990). Ancient and Medieval Nepal (PDF). Kathmandu, Nepal: University of Cambridge.

| Preceded by Nirbhayadeva | King of Nepal; 1007–1030; With: Nirbhayadeva (1007–1009); Bhojadeva (1009–1020); Lakshmikamadeva (1015–1030) | Succeeded by Lakshmikamadeva |
