= Simhadeva (Thakuri dynasty) =

11th-century King of Nepal

King of Nepal
- Reign: 1098–1126
- Predecessor: Harshadeva
- Successor: Indradeva
- Born: 19 June 1057
- Died: 1126 (aged 68–69)
- Issue: Mahendradeva; Aanandadeva; Rudradeva II; Amritadeva
- Dynasty: Thakuri
- Father: Shankaradeva
- Religion: Hinduism

Simhadeva, also known as Shivadeva (Nepali: सिंहदेव), was a Thakuri king of Nepal who reigned from c. 1098–1126.

== Identity ==
Simhadeva is often treated by historians as a figure different than Shivadeva. This is because the colophons mention both the names: Simhadeva, and Shivadeva, while the chronicles only give the name of the then monarch as Shivadeva. Some historians still disagree that both were the same person, but substantial evidences points towards the fact that both the names belonged to the same monarch.

== Reign ==
Simhadeva was a son of Shankaradeva, who was ousted by Vamadeva in 1083. His early reign was generally peaceful and local lords had either partially or completely given their sovereignty to the monarch. However, during the later years of his reign, the feudal lords and the Jivas of Udaypur wielded extreme power and assumed for themselves the title of mahasamanta, previously used by Amshuverma and other Licchavi kings.

Simhadeva was a religious monarch and a devoted follower of both Hinduism and Buddhism. He made donations to the Pashupatinath Temple and is also credited with the founding of Kirtipur. Simhadeva had nominated his elder son Mahendradeva as the heir apparent, but after the death of Simhadeva in 1126, Indradeva succeeded him as the king.

== Bibliography ==
- Petech, Luciano (1984). Medieval History of Nepal (PDF) (2nd ed.). Italy: Fondata Da Giuseppe Tucci.
- Regmi, D.R. (1965). Medieval Nepal. Part I (Early Medieval Period 750–1530 A.D.) (PDF). Calcutta: Firma K.L. Mukhopadhyay.
- Shaha, Rishikesh (1990). Ancient and Medieval Nepal (PDF). Kathmandu, Nepal: University of Cambridge.
- Regmi, Mahesh C. (1971). "Regmi Research Series" (PDF). German Oriental Society. 3.

Preceded by Harshadeva	King of Nepal; 1098–1126	Succeeded by Indradeva
