= Lakshmikamadeva =

11th-century King of Nepal

King of Nepal
- Reign: 1030–1038
- Predecessor: Rudradeva
- Successor: Lakshmikamadeva
- Co-rulers: Rudradeva (1017–1030); Bhojadeva (1017–1020)
- Dynasty: Thakuri
- Religion: Hinduism

Lakshmikamadeva (Nepali: लक्ष्मीकामदेव) was a Thakuri king of Nepal who reigned from c. 1030–1038.

== Reign ==
Lakshmikamadeva's joint rule began from c. 1017 with Rudradeva, and Bhojadeva. From 1020, after Bhojadeva's disappearance, he was ruling jointly with Rudradeva. Rudradeva controlled the area of Patan, while Lakshmikamadeva ruled in Kantipur. After Rudradeva's death in around 1030, Lakshmikamadeva remained as the sole ruler of Nepal Mandala. While Jayadeva governed Patan between 1030 and 1038, Jayadeva's status was inferior than that of Lakshmikamadeva.

He died in c. 1038 and was succeeded by the joint rule of Bhaskaradeva, and Jayadeva.

== Bibliography ==
- Petech, Luciano (1984). Medieval History of Nepal (PDF) (2nd ed.). Italy: Fondata Da Giuseppe Tucci.
- Regmi, D.R. (1965). Medieval Nepal. Lucknow: Firma K.L. Mukhopadhyay.
- Shaha, Rishikesh (1990). Ancient and Medieval Nepal (PDF). Kathmandu, Nepal: University of Cambridge.

Preceded by Rudradeva	King of Nepal; 1030–1038; With: Rudradeva (1017–1030); Bhojadeva (1017–1020)	Succeeded by Bhaskaradeva
