= Thakuri dynasty =

Ruling dynasty of Nepal (879–1200)

Thakuri dynasty 𑐠𑐎𑐹 𑐰𑑄𑐱
- 879 CE–c. 1200 CE
- Common languages: Sanskrit; Classical Newar
- Religion: Hinduism; Buddhism
- Government: Monarchy
- History
  - Established: 879 CE
  - Disestablished: c. 1200 CE
Preceded by	Succeeded by
Licchavi (kingdom)	Malla dynasty
- Today part of: Nepal

Thakuri dynasty (Newar: 𑐠𑐎𑐹 𑐰𑑄𑐱; c. 879 – c. 1200) was a Hindu dynasty that mostly ruled the present-day region of Nuwakot, near central Nepal. The Thakuri dynasty's existence is disputed by some historians. From the beginning of the 8th century to about 12th century, the history of Nepal is mostly unknown. In the meantime, there are no special tools available to account for what happened in the political events in Nepal and what happened in the rise or fall of Nepalese civilization and culture.

When the Lichchavi rule ended and the rule of Thakuris began, the native Newars, who were descendents of the Lichchavis and Kirats were mostly following Shaiva tantric sect and Buddhist Tantric sect during Thakuri dynasty. Available inscriptions and copperplates indicate that Classial Newari Language was used during the Thakuri dynasty. In Thakuri dynasty the earliest known document in Newari is called "The Palmleaf from Uku Bahal" which dates from 1114 during the Thakuri period. The first inscription written entirely in Newari set up by the royal family also dates from this period; a stone inscription from Bajrayogini Temple of Rudradeva from 1173 (NS 293).

== History ==
Raghava Deva is said to have founded a ruling dynasty in 879 CE, when the Lichhavi rule came to an end. To commemorate this important event, Raghava Deva started the 'Nepal Sambat' which began on 20 October, 879 CE.

=== Gunakamadeva ===
After the death of King Raghava Dev, many Thakuri kings ruled southern Nepal up to the middle of the 12th century CE. Gunakama Deva, who ruled from 949 to 994 CE, commissioned the construction of a big wooden shelter, built from the wood of a single tree, called Kasthamandapa. The name of the capital, 'Kathmandu', is derived from this. Gunakama Deva founded the town Kantipur (modern-day Kathmandu). The tradition of Indra Jatra started during his reign. Temples to the north of the temple of Pashupatinath were renovated in this period.

=== Successors of Gunakama Dev ===
Bhola Deva succeeded Gunakama Deva. The next ruler was Laxmikama Deva who ruled from 1024 to 1040 CE. He built the Laksmi Vihara and introduced the tradition of worshiping the Kumari; young prepubescent girls believed to be manifestations of the divine female energy or devi. He was succeeded by his son, Vijayakama Deva, who introduced the worship of the Naga and Vasuki. Vijaykama Deva was the last ruler of this dynasty. After his death, the Thakuri clan of Nuwakot occupied the throne of Nepal.

=== Nuwakot Thakuri Kings ===
Bhaskara Deva, a Thakuri from Nuwakot, succeeded Vijayakama Deva and established the Nuwakot-Thakuri rule. He is said to have built Navabahal and Hemavarna Vihara. After Bhaskara Deva, four kings of this line ruled over the country. They were Bala Deva, Padma Deva, Nagarjuna Deva and Shankara Deva.

Shankara Deva (1067–1080 CE) was the most illustrious ruler of this dynasty. He established the image of 'Shantesvara Mahadeva' and 'Manohara Bhagavati'. The custom of pasting the pictures of Nagas and Vasuki on the doors of houses on the day of Nagapanchami was introduced by him. During his rule, the Buddhists wreaked vengeance on the Hindu Brahmins (especially the followers of Shaivism) for the harm they had received earlier from the Shankaracharya. Shankara Deva tried to pacify the Brahmins harassed by the Buddhists.

=== Suryavansi (the Solar Dynasty) ===
Bama Deva, a descendant of Amshuvarma, defeated Shankar Deva in 1080 CE. He suppressed the Nuwakot-Thankuris with the help of nobles and restored the old Solar Dynasty rule in Nepal for the second time. Harsha Deva, the successor of Bama Deva was a weak ruler. There was no unity among the nobles and they asserted themselves in their respective spheres of influence. Taking that opportunity Nanyadeva, King of the Karnats of Mithila, attacked Nuwakot. The army successfully defended and won the battle.

=== Shivadeva III ===
After Harsha Deva, Shivadeva the third ruled from 1099 to 1126 CE. He was a brave and powerful king. He founded the town of Kirtipur and roofed the temple of Pashupatinath with gold. He introduced twenty-five paisa coins. He also constructed wells, canals, and tanks at different places.

After Sivadeva III, Mahendra Deva, Mana Deva, Narendra Deva II, Ananda Deva, Rudra Deva, Amrita Deva, Ratna Deva II, Somesvara Deva, Gunakama Deva II, Lakmikama Deva III and Vijayakama Deva II ruled Nepal in quick succession. Historians differ about the rule of several kings and their respective times. After the fall of the Thakuri dynasty, a new dynasty was founded by Arideva or Ari Malla, known as the 'Malla dynasty'.

== List of kings ==
Name	Reign	
Name	Nepal Era	Common Era
Raghavadeva	1–30	879–909
Jayadeva	30–40	909–919
Shankaradeva	40–60	919–939
Sahadeva	60–61	939–940
Vikramadeva	61–70	940–949
Gunakamadeva	70–115	949–994
Udaydeva	119–125	998–1004
Nirbhayadeva	125–130	1004–1009
Rudradeva I	128–151	1007–1030
Lakshmikamadeva	151–159	1030–1038
Bhaskaradeva	159–168	1039–1047
Baladeva	168–180	1048–1060
Pradyumnakamadeva	180–186	1060–1066
Nagarjunadeva	186–189	1066–1069
Shankaradeva	189–203	1069–1083
Vamadeva	203–205	1083–1085
Harshadeva	205–219	1085–1098
Shivadeva	219–247	1098–1126
Indradeva	247–257	1126–1136
Manadeva	257–261	1136–1140
Narendradeva	261–267	1140–1147
Aanandadeva	267–287	1147–1167
Rudradeva II	287–295	1167–1175
Amritadeva	295–298	1175–1178
Somesvaradeva	299–303	1178–1183
Gunakamadeva II	304–307	1184–1187
Lakshmikamadeva II	313–317	1192–1197
Vijayakamadeva	312–320	1192–1200
