= Paleo Kathmandu Lake =

Former lake in Nepal, which lay where Kathmandu Valley is today

- Location within Bagmati Province Location within Nepal Location within Asia
- Location: Kathmandu Valley, Nepal
- Coordinates: 27°42′N 85°20′E
- Type: former lake

Paleo Kathmandu Lake is the former lake (or lakes) which lay where Kathmandu Valley is today. Similar to the situation of Pokhara Valley, the valley where the lake once stood is densely populated, and highly vulnerable to both nearby and even distant earthquakes due to liquefaction and amplification of waves because of unsettled clay soil, specifically here called kalimata.

== Geology ==
The basin had two prominent draining events. The first lowering of the water level came 51±13 thousand years ago. An earthquake near Langtang stands as a probable cause. Another earthquake 38 thousand years ago appears to have finished off the lake. Deposits evidence a tsunami about the same time as the final draining.

== Religion ==
This lake is said to have been drained by Manjushree Bodhisattva by cutting open an outlet in the southern rim of the valley. As a result, the valley that was created was fertile and people started cultivating here and building their homes here. As the valley grew, Manjushree is said to have worshipped Swayambhu on the hillock where the present Swayambhu temple is located.

== See also ==
- 1934 Nepal–Bihar earthquake
