= Bhaskaradeva =

11th-century King of Nepal

King of Nepal
- Reign: 1039–1047
- Predecessor: Lakshmikamadeva
- Successor: Baladeva
- Co-ruler: Jayadeva (1039–1044)
- Dynasty: Thakuri
- Religion: Hinduism

Bhaskaradeva (Nepali: भास्करदेव) was a Thakuri king of Nepal who reigned from c. 1039–1047.

== Ancestry ==
The ancestry of Bhaskaradeva is still a topic of debate among scholars. The older chronicles such as the Gopal Raj Vamshavali do not note a change of dynasty from Lakshmikamadeva to Bhaskaradeva. However, a less popular opinion such as that of Sylvain Lévi and Daniel Wright implies a change of dynasty, and further adds that Bhaskaradeva had dethroned either Lakshmikamadeva or Jayadeva and became the king. They suggest that Bhaskaradeva was a Thakuri from Nuwakot, and belonged to the same dynasty as Amshuverma. Modern authors such as D.R. Regmi, and Luciano Petech are strongly critical of the latter view.

== Reign ==
Bhaskaradeva ruled jointly with Jayadeva from c. 1039–1044, and was afterwards the sole ruler of Nepal. Even though Jayadeva is generally considered a co-ruler with Bhaskaradeva, his status was that of a junior king during the reigns of both Bhaskaradeva and Lakshmikamadeva. Bhaskaradeva was succeeded by Baladeva in c. 1047.

== Bibliography ==
- Petech, Luciano (1984). Medieval History of Nepal (PDF) (2nd ed.). Italy: Fondata Da Giuseppe Tucci.
- Regmi, D.R. (1965). Medieval Nepal. Lucknow: Firma K.L. Mukhopadhyay.
- Shaha, Rishikesh (1990). Ancient and Medieval Nepal (PDF). Kathmandu, Nepal: University of Cambridge. Archived from the original (PDF) on 2024-12-03.
- Regmi, Mahesh C. (1971). "Regmi Research Series" (PDF). German Oriental Society. 3. Archived from the original (PDF) on 2019-08-07.

Preceded by Lakshmikamadeva	King of Nepal; 1039–1047; With: Jayadeva (1039–1044)	Succeeded by Baladeva
