= List of educational institutions in Pokhara =

This is a list of notable educational institutions in Pokhara, Nepal.

== Higher education ==
=== University (2) ===
- Pokhara University
- Gandaki University

=== Medicine (3) ===
- Manipal College of Medical Sciences
- Pokhara Academy of Health Science
- Gandaki Medical College

=== Engineering (3) ===
- Pashchimanchal Campus
- Pokhara Engineering College
- Gandaki College of Engineering and Science

=== Forestry (1) ===
- Pokahara Campus

=== Others ===
- Prithivi Narayan Campus
- Janapriya Multiple Campus
- Novel Academy
- LA GRANDEE International College
- Pokhara College Of Management
- Informatics College Pokhara
- Mount Annapurna Campus
- Nepal Tourism and Hotel Management College
- Kantipur Tourism and Hotel Management College
- Gupteshwor Mahadev Multiple Campus
- Kalika Multiple Campus
- Kanya Campus
- Bhadrakali Multiple Campus
- Bindhyabasini Campus
- Charak Hospital Nursing College
- Triveni International College
- Infomax College of Information Technology and Management
- Lake City College and Research Centre
- Laxmi Adarsha Multiple College

== High schools ==
- Adarsha English Boarding School
- Anjuli Secondary Boarding School, Pokhara 1, Purano Tundikhel
- Bal Mandir Secondary School, Nadipur Pokhara 3
- Bal Kalyan Secondary School
- Bal Vidhya Mandir Secondary Boarding School, Miya Patan, Kundahar
- Basline Academy School, Kundahar 12
- Bhasker Memorial School, Phoolbari 11
- Bidur English Boarding High School
- Bir Lower Secondary School, Lekhnath 2, Rithepani, Kaski
- Bishwo Shanti Higher Secondary School, Deurali 2, Kaski
- Brahma Rupa Secondary School, Pokhara 32, Rajako Chautara, Kaski
- Children's Academy
- Choreptan Higher Secondary School, Chorepatan, Pokhara
- Cosmos International College
- Diamond Higher Secondary School, Talchowk, Lekhnath, Kaski
- Disneyland Academy, Masbar 7 Pokhara
- Dynamic Academy, Simalchour, Pokhara, Kaski]
- Fishtail Higher Secondary Boarding School
- Gandaki Boarding School
- Global Collegiate Higher Secondary School, Ranipauwa
- Gogan Higher Secondary School, Lekhnath 13, Gagangauda, Kaski
- Golden Future Boarding Higher Secondary School
- Gorkha English Boarding School
- Gurukul Higher Secondary School, Newroad (Ahead of Pokhara Metropolitan Office)
- Gyankunj Vidyashram, Lekhnath 8, Mohariya
- Hill Point Boarding School, Matepani
- Hill Side English Boarding School, Nayapool, Kaski
- Himalayan Boarding School, Gharipatan, Pokhara 17
- Himanchal Boarding School
- Janapriya Uccha Madhyamik Vidhalaya
- Jyotikunj Education Foundation Rambazar
- Kaski Mordenized Academy, Chauthe 14
- Krishna Prasad Devkota Higher Secondary School, Lumle Kaski
- Kumudini Homes
- L.P. Devkota Memorial English Boarding School, Pardi Birauta
- Laxmi Awasiya Higher Secondary School, Newroad
- Little Step Higher Secondary Boarding School, Simalchaur
- Lotus Academic School, Naya bazar, Pokhara
- Manakamana Secondary Boarding School, Fulbari
- Marigold Boarding School, Nayagaun
- Metropolitan Academy, Ramghat
- Morning Star Higher Secondary Boarding School, Naudada-3 kaski
- Motherland Higher Secondary School, Masbar 7, Kaski
- Mount Annapurna Higher Secondary School, Nadipur, Pokhara
- Mount Everest Boarding School
- Nawa Prabhat Secondary School, Pokhara 9, Naya Bazar
- National Boarding Secondary School, Baidam
- National Inventive Secondary Boarding School, Baidam
- Nepal Adarsha Awasiya Vidhyalaya
- New Galaxy Higher Secondary School, Nadipur, Pokhara
- New Millennium Academy
- New Model Higher Secondary School, Nagdhunga, Pokhara 8
- Paramount Public School
- Pashchimanchal Higher Secondary School, Gairapatan, Pokhara 4
- Pokhara Academy
- Pokhara Higher Secondary School, Bhimkalipatan 1, Bagar
- Pokhara Public School
- Pragati English Boarding School
- Prativa Higher secondary school, Ramghat 10
- Rainbow Academy
- Ram Prathamik Vidhyalaya
- Rastriya Higher Secondary School, Pokhara Tudikhel 1, Kaski
- Sagarmatha Niketan Higher Secondary School
- Sainik Awasiya Mahavidyalaya, Pokhara
- Shanti Nikunja Boarding School, Birauta
- Saraswati Adarsha Vidyashram, Lamachour
- Shantideep School, Majheri Patan
- Shishu Kalyan English Secondary School, Chhorepata
- Shishu Niketan Higher Secondary School
- Shree Amarsingh Model Higher Secondary School, Amarsingh Chowk
- Shree Gyan Jyoti Secondary School, Armala
- Shree Ratna Jyoti Higher Secondary School, Rantna Chowk
- Sarswati Higher Secondary School
- Siddhartha Secondary Boarding School
- Siddivinayak Boarding School
- SOS Hermann Gmeiner Secondary School Gandaki, Rambazar
- SOS Hermann Gmeiner Secondary School Pokhara, Chhorepatan
- Spiral Galaxy Higher Secondary School, Simpani 1, Pokhara
- Srijana Secondary School, Phirke
- St. Mary's Higher Secondary School
- Step By Step higher Secondary School, Masbar, Pokhara
- Sublime Secondary School, Ratnachowk
- Tarakunj English Boarding School, Kahaun Khola 13
- Tarapunja Education Academy, Adhikari tole Pokhara
- Tal Barahi Secondary School
- Tops Boarding School, Ramghat
- Shining Star Boarding School, Baidam, Pokhara-6
- Vindhyaswori Adarsha Boarding School, Mohariyatole, Pokhara-1
