= Bishnu Shrestha =

Gurkha soldier

Bishnu Prasad Shrestha
- बिष्णुप्रसाद श्रेष्ठ
- Born: 1975 (age 50–51); Parbat, Nepal
- Occupation: Gurkha soldier (8th Gorkha Rifles)
- Known for: Showing bravery in Maurya Express robbery incident
- Awards: Sena Medal; Uttam Jeevan Raksha Padak

Bishnu Prasad Shrestha (Nepali: बिष्णुप्रसाद श्रेष्ठ; born 1975) is a Nepalese Gurkha soldier in the Indian Army (7th battalion the 8th Gorkha Rifles) and recipient of the Sena Medal for bravery and the Uttam Jeevan Raksha Padak medal for his gallant conduct during an armed train robbery.

== Early life, family and education ==
Shrestha was born in Bachchha Deurali Khola, ward no. 9 of Parbat district in the western part of Nepal.

He and his family moved to Pokhara after being recruited to an Indian Gurkha regiment. His father Gopal Babu also served in the same 7/8 Platoon, retiring in 1981.

== Train robbery incident ==
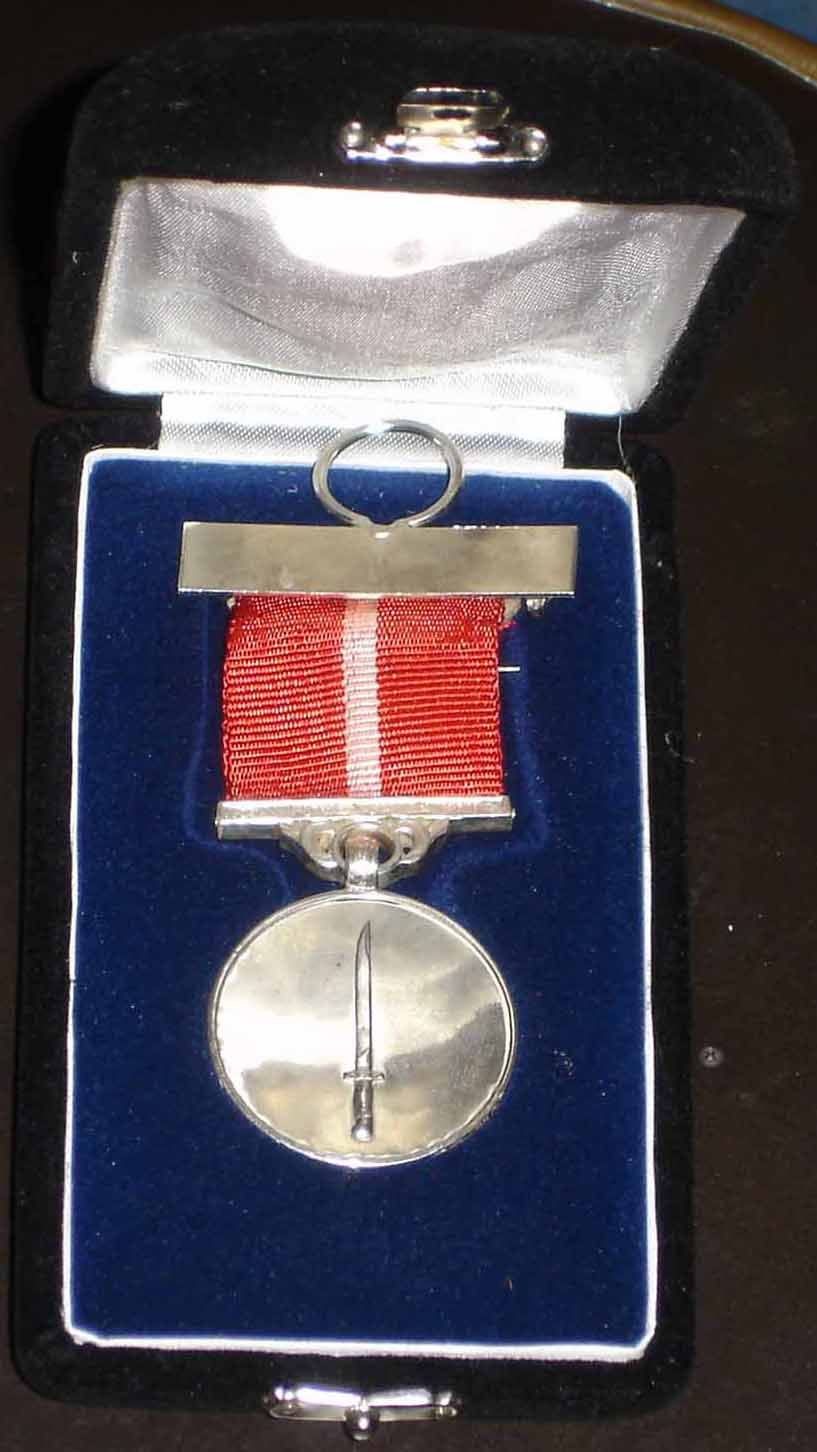
The Sena Medal, awarded by the Indian government "for such individual acts of exceptional devotion to duty or courage as have special significance for the Army"

In September 2010, Bishnu Shrestha was a 35 (Note: Sometimes reported as 45)-year-old Gurkha soldier who had just retired. He was traveling from Ranchi to Gorakhpur, Uttar Pradesh via the Maurya Express (Hatia-Gorakhpur) train when between 15 and 40 robbers, armed with "guns, daggers and tangis" stopped the train they were on near Chittaranjan, West Bengal, and robbed and injured other passengers.

Shrestha was asleep when the bandits reached him. Awakened, he was preparing to hand over his valuables, but an 18-year-old girl next to him was grabbed by the robbers who intended to rape her. The girl, who was traveling with her parents, called for help. As one of the bandits was snatching a woman's earrings, Shrestha pulled out the large, curved khukuri that all Gurkha soldiers carry and attacked the criminals, injuring three of them, he recalled, although another report stated three bandits were killed and eight more were injured.

Shrestha told the Times of India:

I am a soldier and get paid to protect citizens of this country. I could not sit back and watch as passengers were looted. I pulled out my khukuri and attacked the criminals. I succeeded in connecting with at least three of them. The blows were severe and they must have got themselves admitted to some hospital. By then, the criminals started fighting back. They fired a shot that missed me. At one point of time, the khukuri fell from my hand and I was overpowered. They picked it up and used it on me.

Bleeding and defeated, Shrestha succeeding in preventing the assault of the girl, but the thieves continued robbing the passengers. Six robbers were arrested, according to a security commandant, and Rs 10,470 in cash, 33 mobile phones, 14 wristwatches, an ATM card, two pistols, live cartridges, and seven daggers in their possession were seized from them. Shrestha recovered full use of his injured hand after receiving two months of medical treatment. Another source reported that loot was recovered elsewhere that totaled "around 400,000 Indian rupees in cash, 40 gold necklaces, 200 cell phones, 40 laptops and other items that the fleeing robbers dropped in the train", although the news report did not mention if these figures were confirmed by the authorities.

== Aftermath ==
Shrestha was pleased by the appreciation he received and thanked the media for covering the news, remarking:

The Indian media brought the incident to light and the Nepalese media too gave it due importance. I may have even been sent to jail on the charge of robbery had the girl and the Indian media not come forward to my support. I was hardly recognized even in Baidam [his neighbourhood]. Now the whole country knows me.

He was honored by many organizations (public and private), including mothers' groups, schools and political leaders.

When the intended rape victim's family offered him a cash reward, he refused it, explaining, "Fighting the enemy in battle is my duty as a soldier. Taking on the thugs on the train was my duty as a human being." However, his regiment gave him a "cash reward of Rs. 50,000 and terminated his voluntary retirement, so that he could get a customary promotion after he receives the medals", as well as "cash rewards from the government, special discounts" on certain air and train travel fares.

== In popular culture ==
Bollywood music director, singer and actor Himesh Reshammiya announced that he would make a biopic on him based upon his heroics of the Maurya Express train robbery.
