= Gyanu Rana =

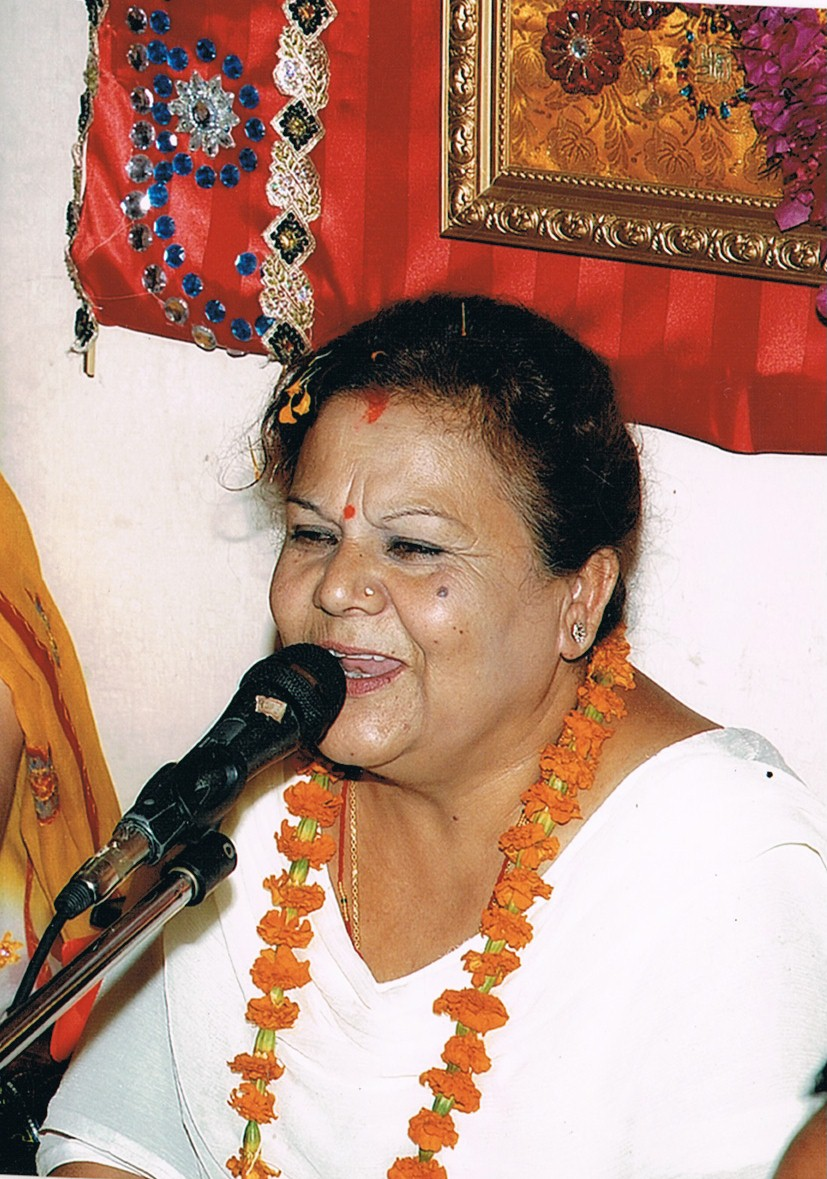
- Gyanu Rana

Background information
- Born: October 3, 1949 (age 76); Batulechaur, Pokhara
- Genres: Modern, Folk
- Occupation: Singer
- Instrument(s): Nepali, western

Gyanu Rana (Nepali: ज्ञानु राणा; born October 3, 1949) is a singer and a reality show judge, born in Batulechaur, Pokhara, Nepal. She wrote and sang popular Nepali songs like "Siri Ma Siri Ni Kanchha" and "Manchhe Ko Maya Yaha" with Narayan Gopal.

== Early life and education ==
Rana is the daughter of Dharmaraj Thapa, a noted poet and renowned folk singer. Her father worked in Radio Nepal and was later appointed a member of Nepal Academy, a Nepalese government institution formed for the promotion and development of Nepalese culture. Her mother, Savitri Thapa, is the founder of Dharmaraj Savitri Thapa Lok Sahitya Guthi, a forum to promote Nepalese folk songs and culture.

Rana grew up in the Batulechaur subdivision of Pokhara, Nepal, and studied there until the primary level. She later moved to Kathmandu for higher studies. She completed her education in 1965, while enrolled in Padma Kanya, Dillibazar. She studied home science in Bharateswori Homes of Mymensingh in Bangladesh during 1967–68 and passed her intermediate level examination from Tribhuvan University of Nepal in 1970. In 1977, she trained at the Music College, Baroda under M. S. University, Baroda, India. In 1982 she received a degree of Senior-level Diploma in first division from Prayag Sngeet Samiti of Allahabad, India.

== Career ==
Rana has been actively involved in music since her early childhood. Her father, noted folk singer Dharma Raj Thapa, participated in different programs on Radio Nepal, the only government radio station at the time. Like her father she also has a speciality in folk songs although she is expert in singing modern songs and pop songs as well. By now she has recorded more than 2000 songs in Nepali, Hindi and Urdu languages as well as in local Bhojapuri, Maithali and Newari languages of Nepal. Such songs include modern, classical, folk songs, bhajans and gazals of different nature.

Mrs Rana's songs where regularly transmitted through the national media such as Radio Nepal, local FM channels, Nepal Television and many other TV channels of Nepal for the last forty years. She has participated in more than ten Nepalese films as a background singer. By now she participated as a judge in many national musical competitions organized by academic and cultural organizations. She has actively participated in many cultural and international musical concerts that include first SAARC summit in Bangladesh and cultural festivals organized in India, China, South Korea, Japan, Singapore, Thailand and USSR etc.

Rana worked in the government owned Royal Nepal Academy from 1970 to 2006 starting from the post of Artist (Music) to the Asstt. Director (Music) gazetted third class level at the time of retirement. She visited many countries of the world that include India, Bhutan, Bangladesh, China, Thailand, Singapore, USSR, South Korea and Japan and more.

She fluently speaks in Nepali, Hindi, English, and Bengali languages.

She classified as a Famous Class Singer by the government owned Radio Nepal in the year 2055 BS

== Awards and nominations ==
Rana had been nominated honorary member of Sheela Pratisthan in 2065 B.S. She was also nominated honorary member of Guras Sanskritik Pariwar and Narayan Sageet Pratisthan in the year 2046 and 2053 BS respectively. She has received success in many musical competitions organized in the national and international level. Some of them are:

1. First position in the Folk Song competition organized by Radio Nepal during its Silver Jubilee festival.
2. First place in classical music competition organized by Kalanidhi Sangeet Vidyalaya in 2042 BS.
3. Excellent voice second place in B. P. memorial awareness day program organized in 2042 BS.
4. The third position in Ratna Sangeet competition organized by Ratna Recording Corporation in 2045 BS.
5. Best singer in a cultural program organized by Sankalpa Lioness club in the year 1990.
6. The second position in the Summer Music Festival in 1987 AD followed by second place in the International day of Music in 1988 organized by French
7. Cultural Center, Kathmandu, Nepal.
8. Second place in the Awareness Song Competition organized by Public Awareness Forum in 2048 BS.
9. Best Singer Award in Video Film Festival in 2047 BS.

She also received many national high-level honours and awards. Some of them are:

- Prabal Gorkha Daxin Bahu IV of Nepal government
- Indra Rajya Laxmi Puraskar
- Rastriya Pratibha Puraskar
- Chinna Lata Puraskar
- Nati Kazi Puraskar
- Dharma Raj Svitri Thapa Lok Sahitya Puraskar
- Deergha Sewa Padak (Royal Nepal Academy)
- Rajyabhisek Padak

== Personal life ==
Rana was married to Er. Shree Prakash Jang Rana in the year 1970 and now she has two sons named Binaya Jang Rana and Bikash Jang Rana both being engineers in the field of computer science. Both of her sons are married and she also has two grandsons named Binayak and Bisharad. Presently she is passing her retired life at home with a casual contribution in music and devotion towards religious performances.
