= Bijayapur-I Small Hydropower Project =

Commissioned in 2012, Bijayapur-I Small Hydropower Project is a run of the river type hydroelectric project on Bijayapur Khola in Pokhara. It's a private power station built by Bhagawati Hydropower Development Co. (P.) Ltd. that feeds to Nepal's National Electricity Grid through a power purchase agreement with Nepal Electricity Authority. Its installed capacity if 4.5 MW.
