= Neupane =

Neupane/Nyaupane
Origin
- Language: Khas Bhasa

Other names
- Derivatives: Neupane Sharma, Neupane Khatri
- See also: Acharya (Kalikote), Sapkota, Parajuli, Thapa (Bagale)

Neupane (Nepali: न्यौपाने) also spelled as Nyaupane or Neupaney is a Nepalese surname.

== Notable People of the Neupane family ==
- Amar Neupane (Nepali writer)
- Kedar Neupane (Nepali politician)
- Kedar Nath Neupane (Nepali educator & author)
- Mukunda Neupane (Nepali trade unionist & politician)
- Yogmaya Neupane (Social activist)
