= INM =

The initials INM may stand for:

- Ireland's Independent News & Media
- International Mountain Museum, a museum in Nepal
- Mexico's Instituto Nacional de Migración
- Iraq's al-Iraqiyya National Movement
- UK Institute of Naval Medicine
