= Phewa Hydropower Station =

Fewa Hydroelectric Project
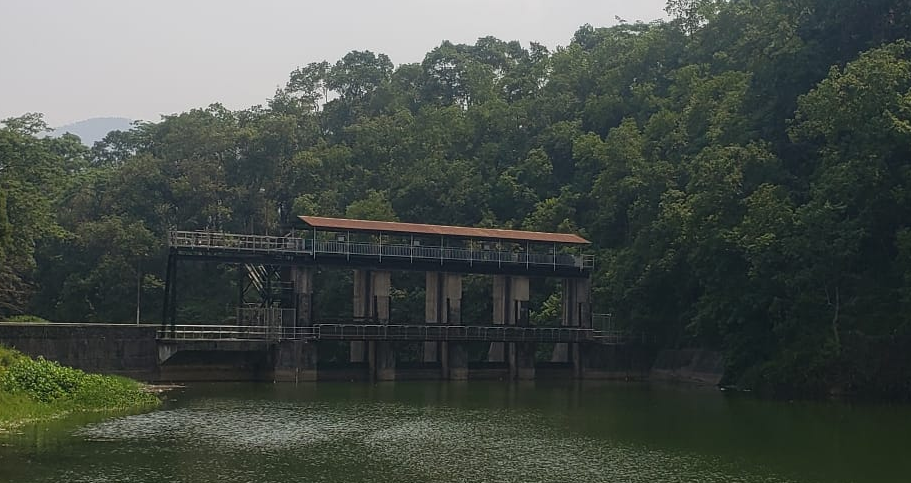
- Fewa dam on Fewa Lake

- Nepal
- Country: Nepal
- Location: Phewa Lake, Pokhara Valley
- Coordinates: 28.1955°N 83.9677°E
- Purpose: Hydroelectricity
- Status: Operational
- Opening date: 1969

Dam and spillways
- Type of dam: Run-of-river

Power Station
- Coordinates: 28.19577356480367°N 83.96791322293042°E
- Installed capacity: 1 MW

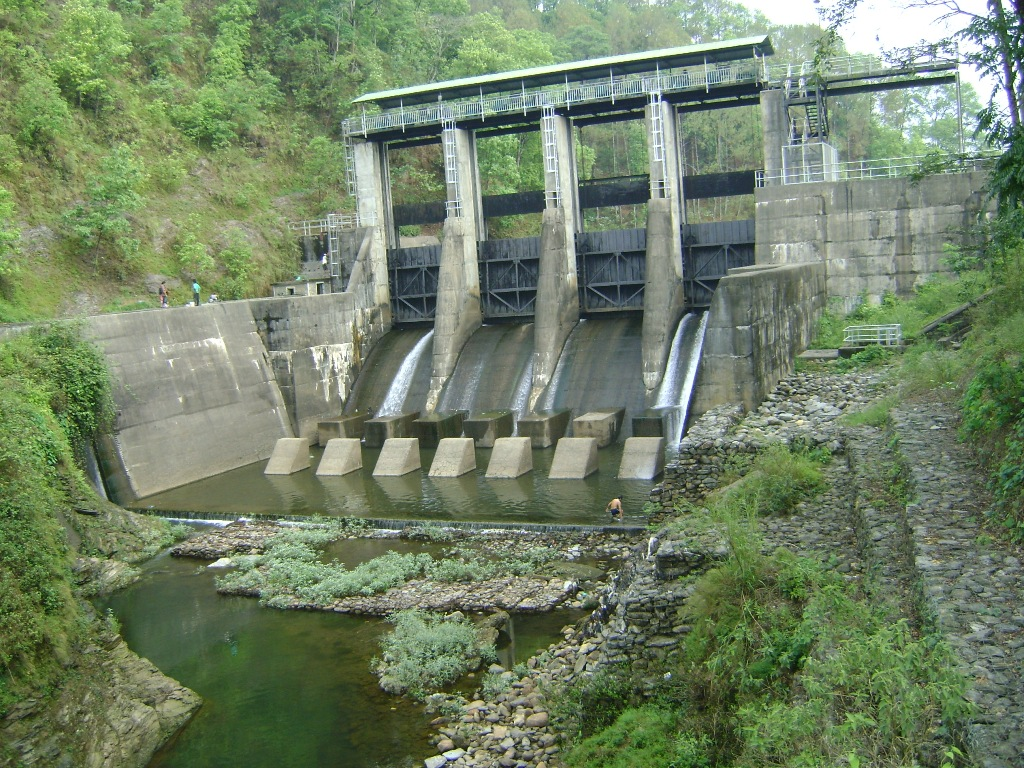
Dam site

Phewa Hydropower Station, or Fewa Hydropower Station, is the first hydropower plant in the city of Pokhara, commissioned in 1969 AD. Water from Phewa Lake is directed to this powerplant to produce 1 Megawatt of electricity from 4 generators.
