= Sital Devi =

Sital Devi सीतल देवी
- Location in Nepal Sital Devi (Nepal)
- Coordinates: 28.2184°N 84.0014°E
- Country: Nepal
- Province: Gandaki
- City: Pokhara
- Ward No: 12

Population
  - Total: 11,613
- Time zone: +5:45 (Nepali Time)

Sital Devi (Nepali: सीतल देवी) is a residential area located in ward number 12 in Pokhara Metropolitan City in Nepal. Sital Devi temple is located near this place.
