= Furse Khola =

River in Nepal

Coordinates: 28°09′43″N 84°00′34″E

Furse Khola is a tributary of the Seti Gandaki River in Pokhara, Nepal. It joins the Seti Gandaki to the south of Pokhara International Airport.
