= Malepatan =

Malepatan is the name of Ward Number 5 in Pokhara Metropolitan City in Nepal, one of 33 wards which comprise the city.

A quarantine facility at Agriculture Training Centre in this ward was decided to be set up for COVID-19 patients in March 2020.
