= Harpan Khola =

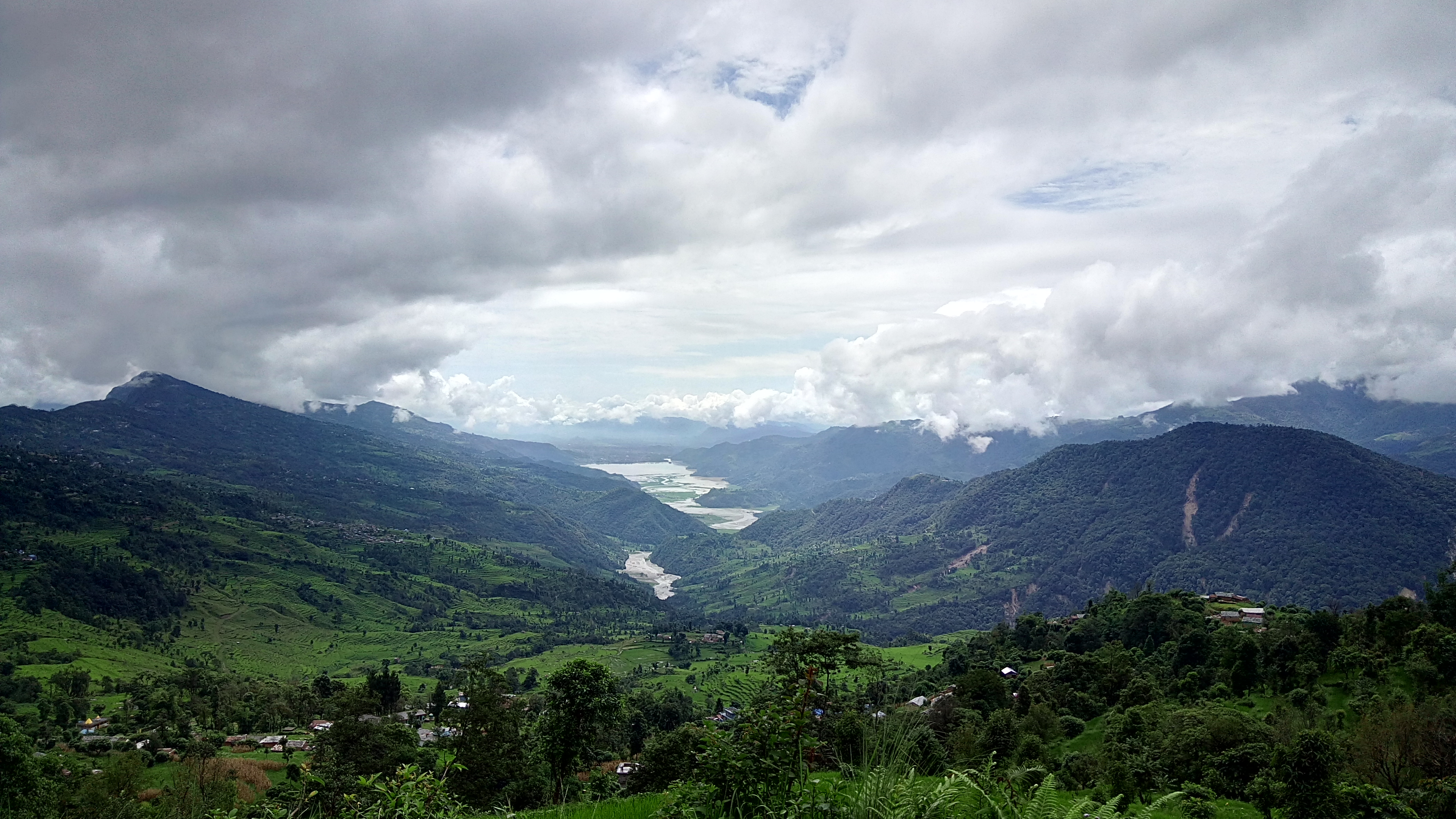

Physical characteristics
- Source
  - coordinates: 28.223928°N 83.859791°E
- Mouth
  - location: Phewa Lake

Harpan Khola (river) is a tributary of Phewa Lake in Pokhara.
