= Yamdi Khola =

- Native name: यामदी खोला (Nepali)

Physical characteristics
- Source
  - location: 28.290541°N 83.853357°E
- Mouth
  - location: Seti Gandaki River

Yamdi Khola(Nepali : यामदी खोला) is a tributary of Seti Gandaki River in Pokhara.
