= Pumdikot Shiva Statue =

Hindu temple at Pumdikot, Pokhara, Nepal

Shiva Statue Pumdikot पुम्दिकोट शिव मूर्ति
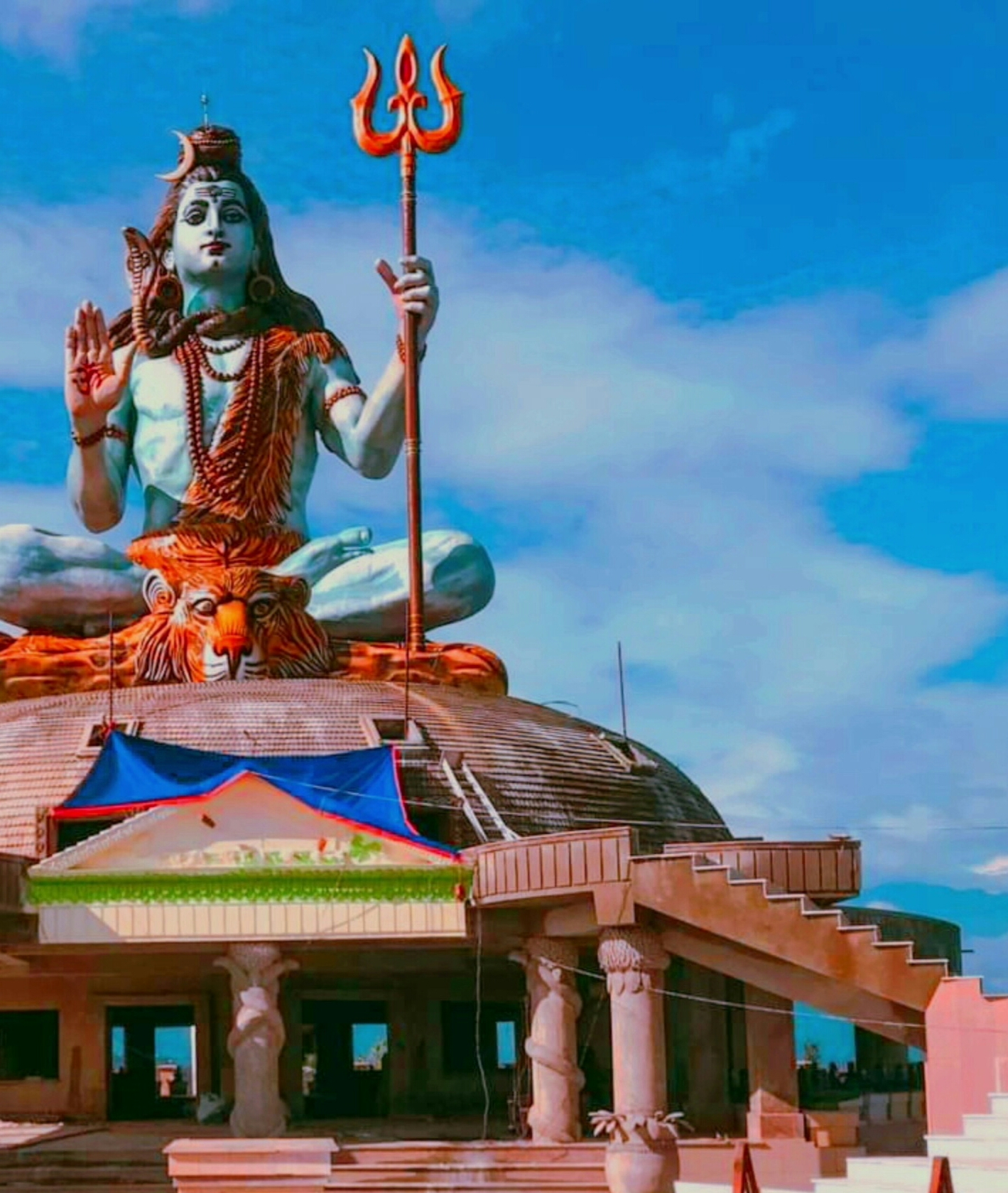
- Shiva Statue of Pumdikot
- Interactive map of Shiva Statue Pumdikot पुम्दिकोट शिव मूर्ति
- Location: Pumdikot, Kaski District
- Coordinates: 28°19′N 83°59′E
- Type: Shiva statue
- Height: 108 feet
- Opening date: Round the year
- Dedicated date: Hindu

Pumdikot is a hill station near Pokhara in Kaski District of Gandaki Province in Nepal. The place has a viewpoint at an altitude of 1,500 meters above sea level and has the second tallest statue of Shiva in Nepal, after Kailashnath Mahadev Statue.

== Shiva statue ==
Pumdikot is the second tallest statue of Shiva in Nepal. The statue itself is 51 feet tall. It sits on a white stupa that adds 57 feet to the height, making the entire structure 108 feet high. The statue is part of a larger plan currently underway to construct the Martyr’s Memorial Park, a model of Mount Sumeru featuring Shiva and Parvati and ensuring that the entire park is accessible to persons with disabilities. The park is projected to be about 50% complete, with the Shiva statue being completed in late 2021. The statue premises also have 108 Shiva lingas that encircle the statue at its base.

The construction of statues has helped to promote the region as a destination for religious tourists. From the viewpoint, Pokhara Valley, Phewa Lake can be seen. The Himalayas and World Peace Pagoda can also be seen from the place.

== Gallery ==
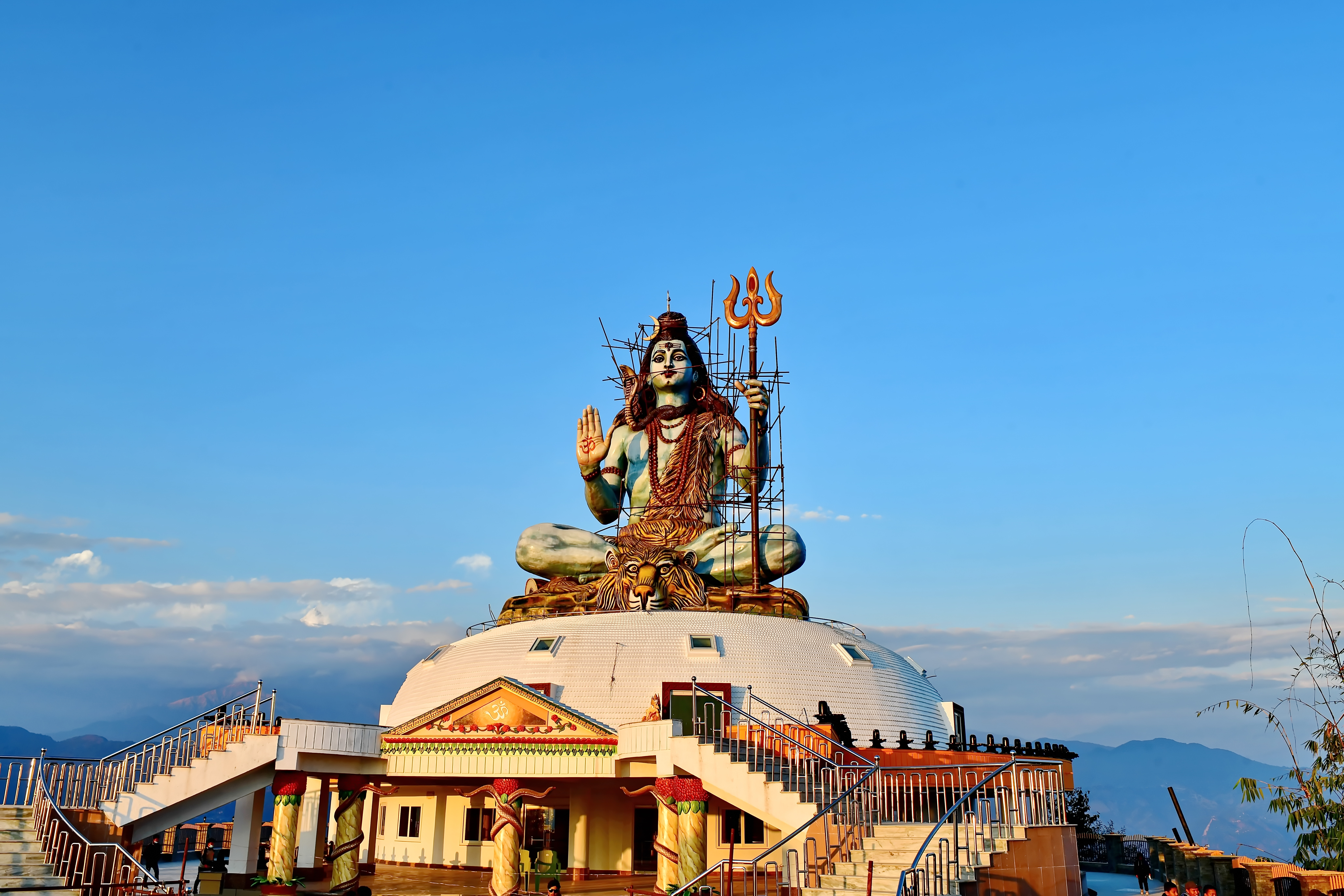

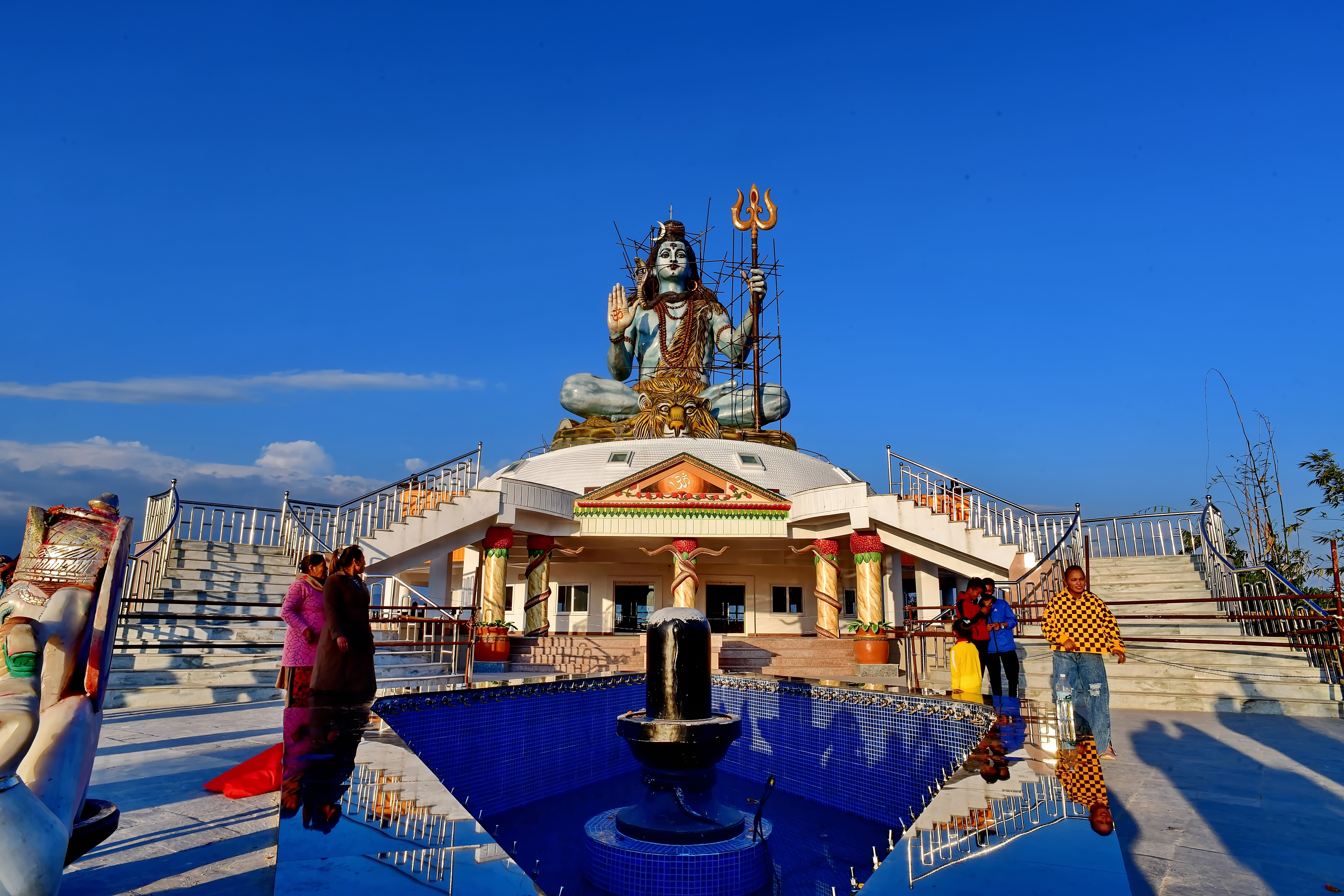

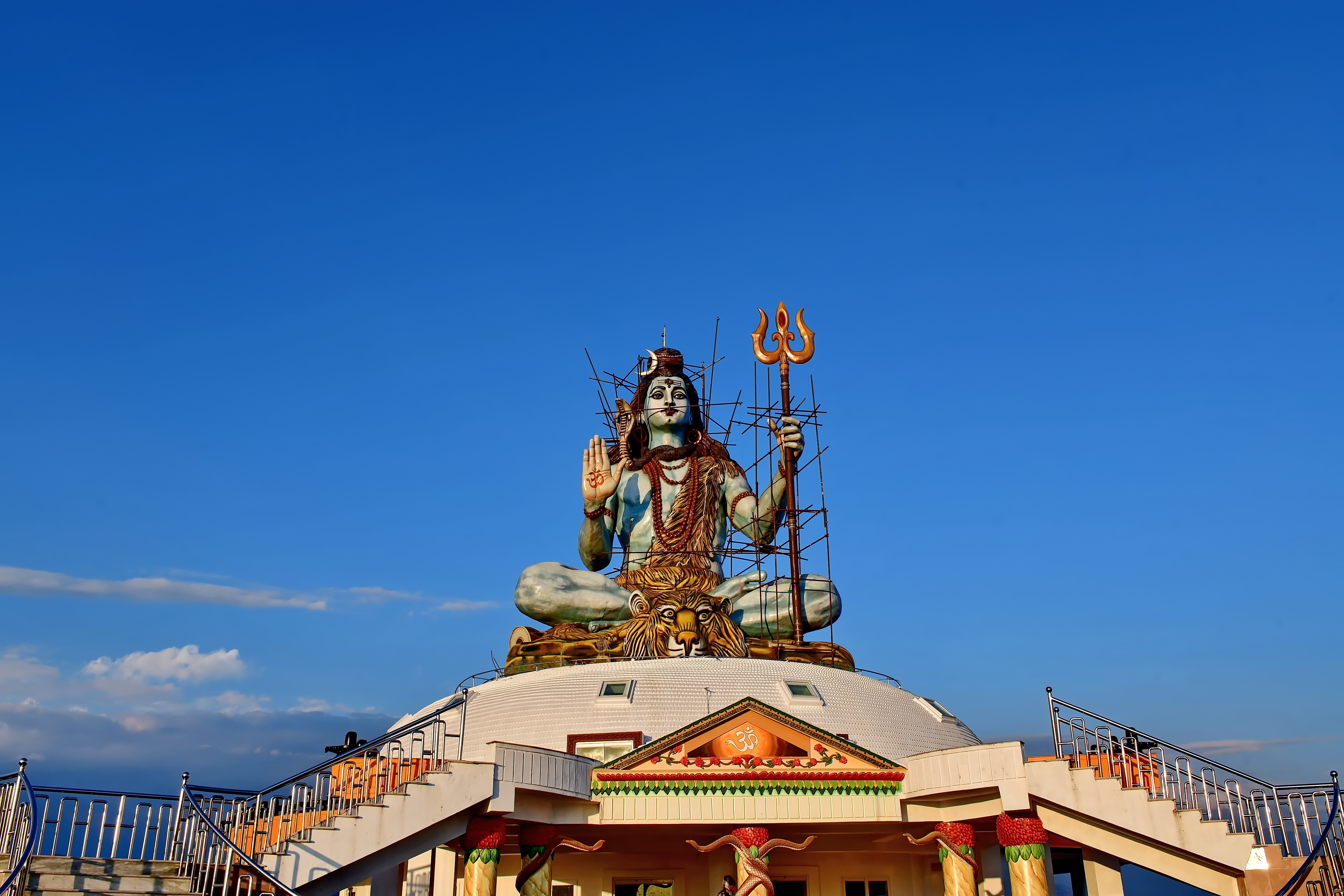

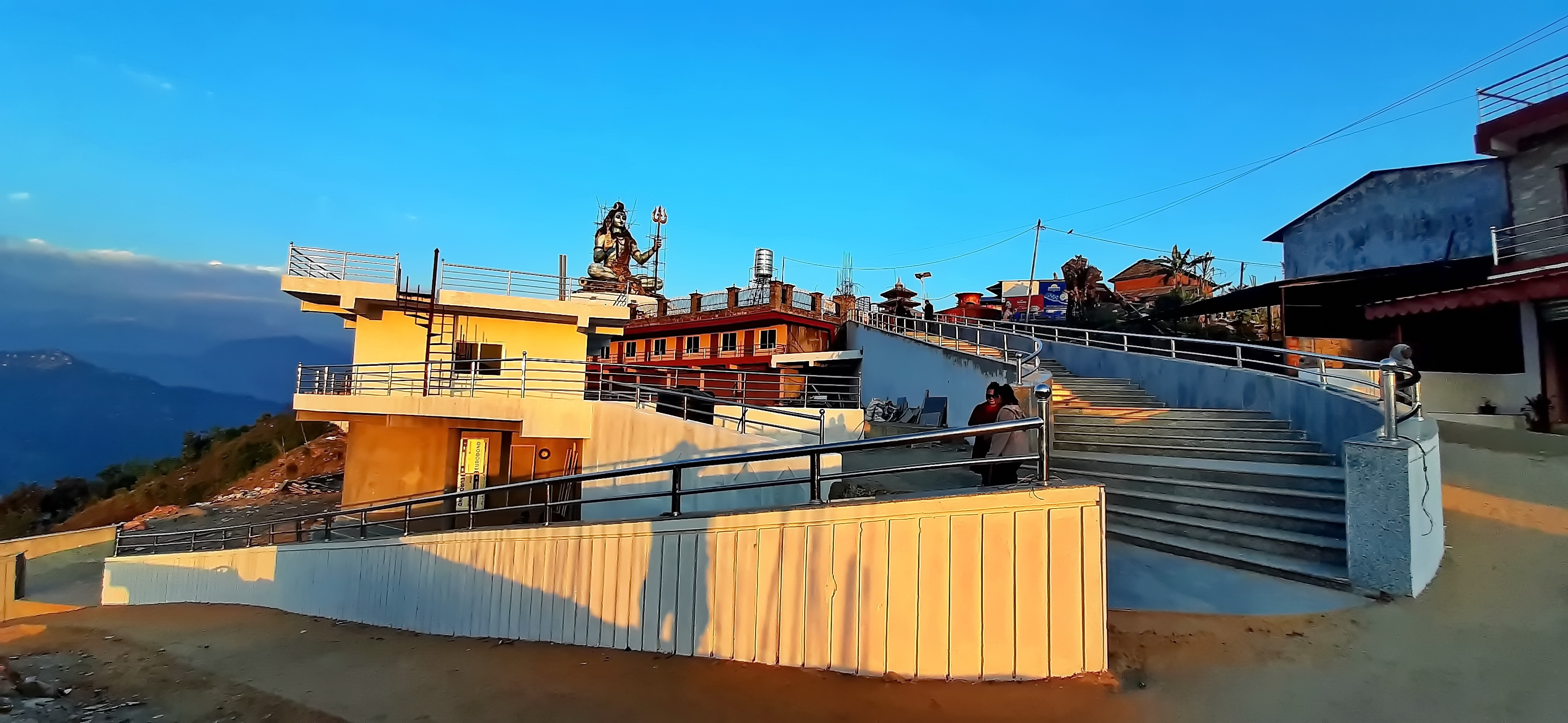

== See also ==
- List of Hindu temples in Nepal
