= Kahun Khola =

River tributary in Nepal

Kahun Khola (Nepali : काहु खोला) is a tributary of Bijayapur Khola in Pokhara.
