= Dada Parajul =

Dada Parajul डाँडापराजुल dipendra jung shahi
- Village development committee
- Location in Nepal
- Coordinates: 28.74°N 81.69°E
- Country: Nepal
- Zone: Bheri Zone
- District: Dailekh District

Government

Population (1991)
  - Total: 4,328
- Time zone: UTC+5:45 (Nepal Time)

Dada Parajul is a village development committee in Dailekh District in the Bheri Zone of western-central Nepal. At the time of the 1991 Nepal census it had a population of 4328 people living in 728 individual households.
