= Baidam =

Baidam is the name of Ward Number 6 in Pokhara Metropolitan City in Nepal. The famous lakeside area along with Phewa Lake is located in this ward.
