= Parajuli =

Parajuli (Nepali: पराजुली Nepali pronunciation: [pʌrad͡zuli]) also spelled as Parajuly, Parajulee is a hill-brahmin and chhetri surname found in Nepal and some parts of India.

Notable people with the surname include:

- Suvanga Parajuli, Nepali Diplomat
- Gopal Parajuli, Nepali poet and Madan Puraskar winner
- Gopal Prasad Parajuli, Chief Justice of Nepal
- Hari Parajuli, Nepali minister and politician
- Nawaraj Parajuli, Nepali poet best known for popularizing the slam poetry genre in Nepal
- Prajwal Parajuly, Indian writer noted for The Gurkha's Daughter

== See also ==
- Awal Parajul, village of Parajuli
- Dada Parajul, village of Parajuli
