= International Mountain Museum =

History museum in Pokhara, Nepal

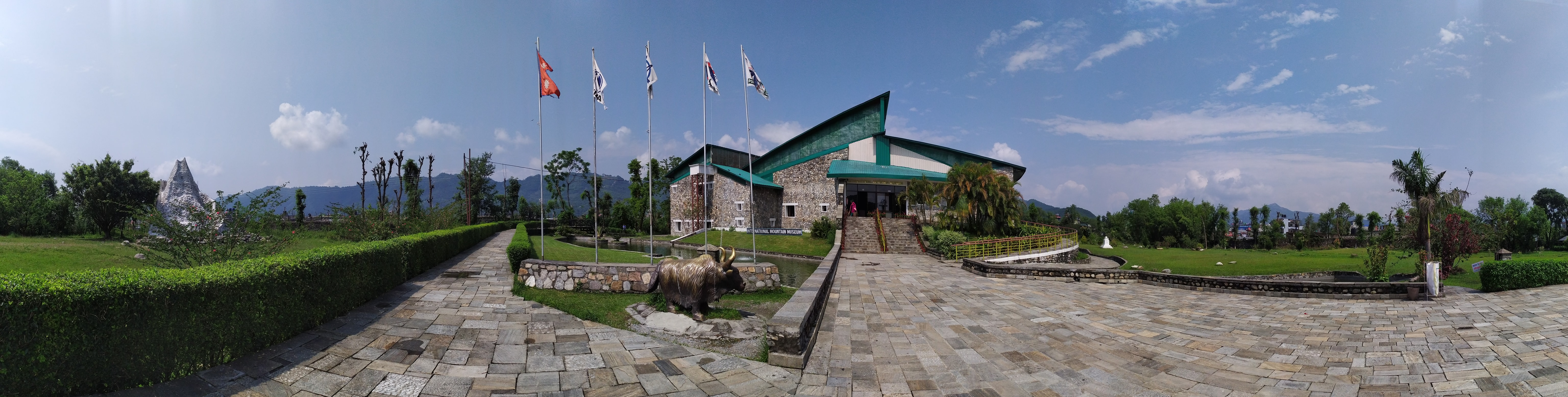

- location in Nepal Map,
- Location: Pokhara, Nepal
- Coordinates: 28.190065°N 83.982860°E
- Type: History Museum
- Website: www.internationalmountainmuseum.org

The International Mountain Museum (INM) is a museum located in Pokhara, Nepal.

== History ==
The museum was inaugurated on 5 February 2004.

During the years 2015-2016, visits to the museum dropped sharply, and its revenue also dropped by 50%, a direct consequence of the country's 2015 earthquakes. By 2019, 2.1 million tourists had visited the museum since its opening. Due to the covid-19 pandemic, the museum closed in March 2020 and reopened in November 2020.

== Description ==
More than 100,000 domestic and international tourists visit the International Mountain Museum (IMM) every year. IMM records, documents and exhibits the past and present developments related to mountain and mountaineering around the world.

The museum contains three main exhibition halls: Hall of Great Himalayas, Hall of Fame and Hall of World Mountains. There are exhibits on famous peaks, descriptions of famous mountaineers, the culture and lifestyle of mountain people, flora subscribe and fauna including geology, in an attempt to represent the traditional culture and values of the Nepalese people.

There is also an exhibition about the Yeti, an outdoors "living museum" dedicated to Nepal's indigenous tribes, and a 31-foot replica of Mt. Manaslu.

The museum runs under the direct supervision of Nepal's Department of Archeology.

== Gallery ==
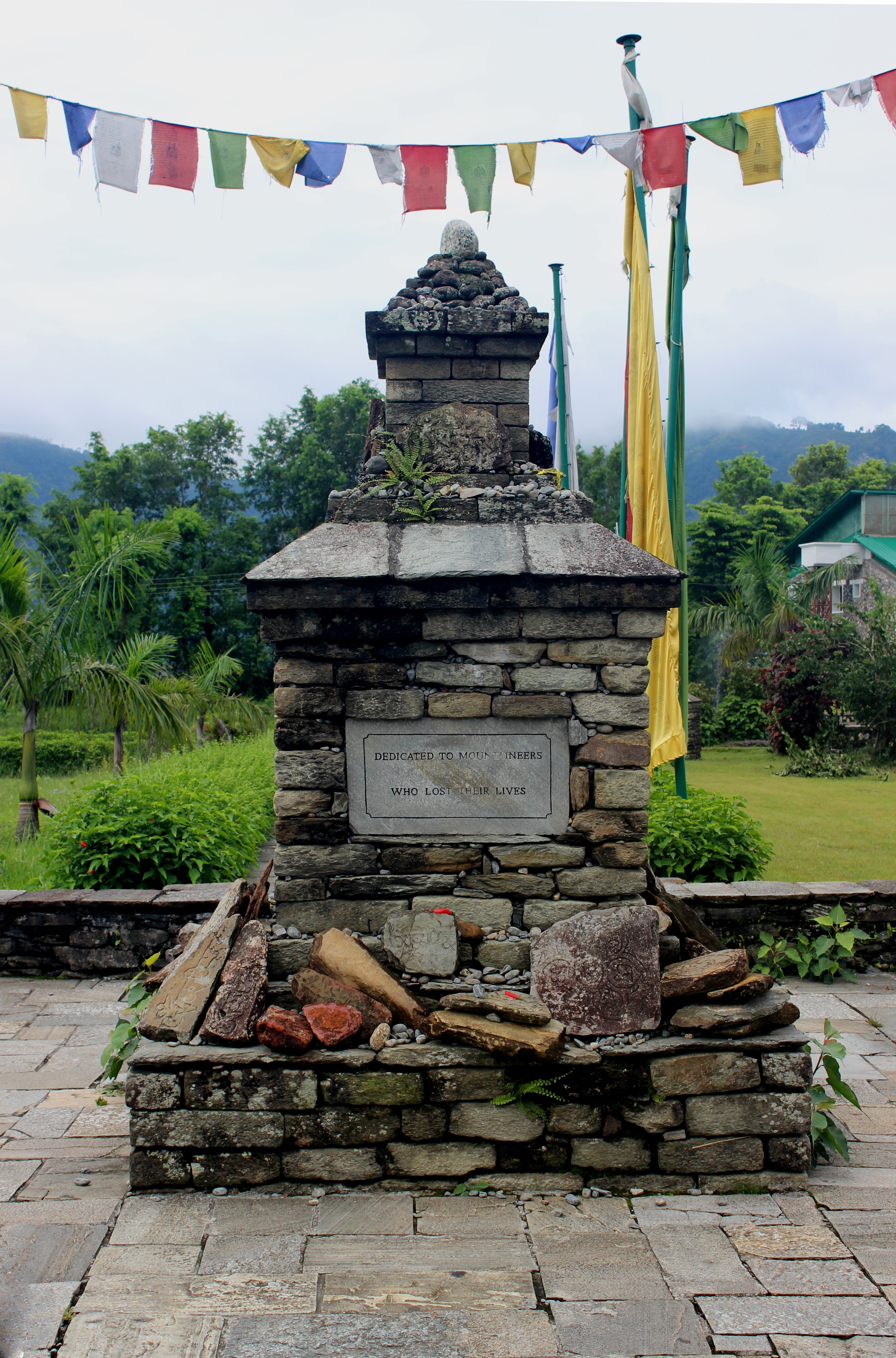
A monument dedicated to mountaineers located at the museum

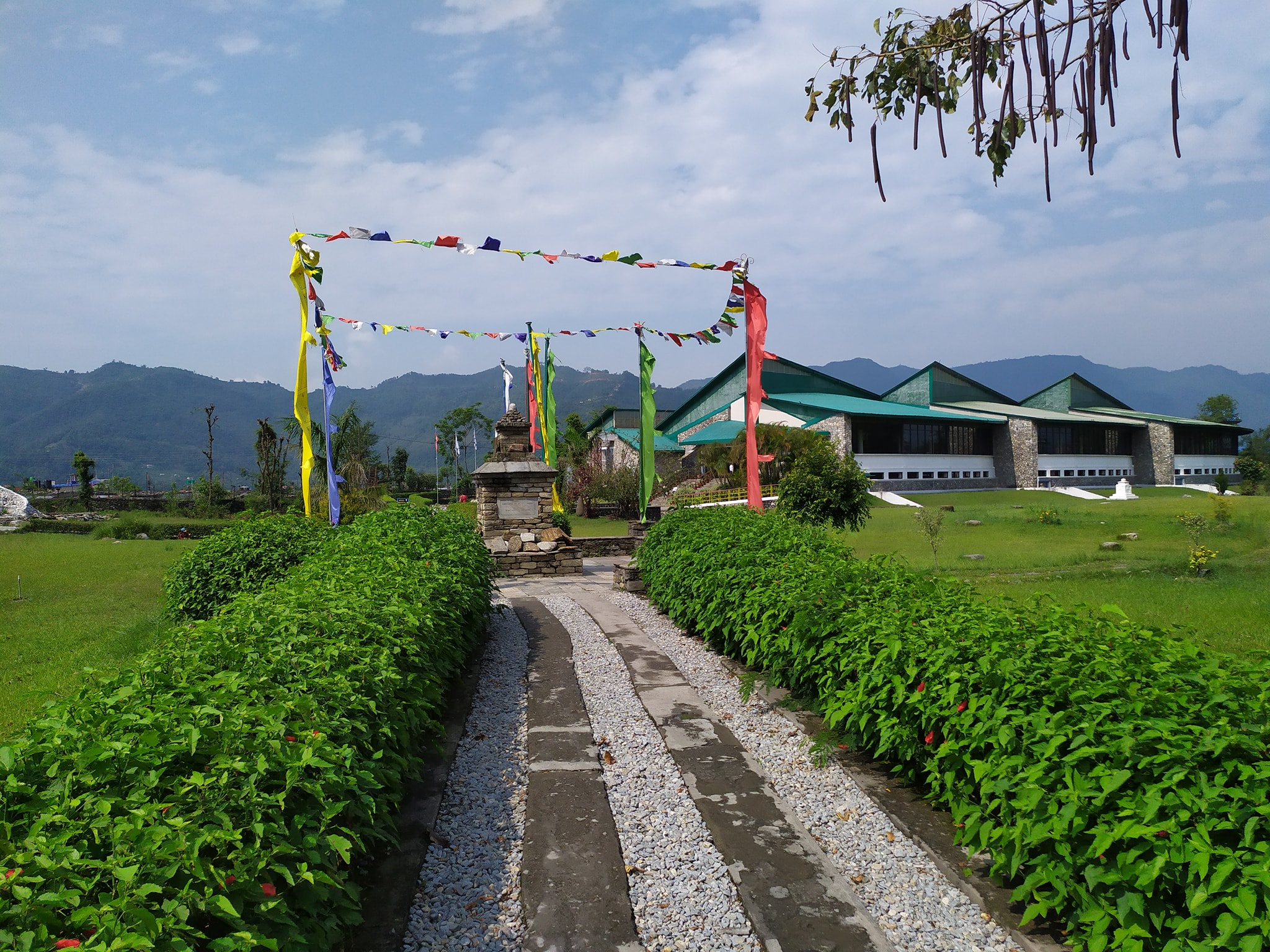
A monument dedicated to mountaineers who lost their lives along the path to museum hall

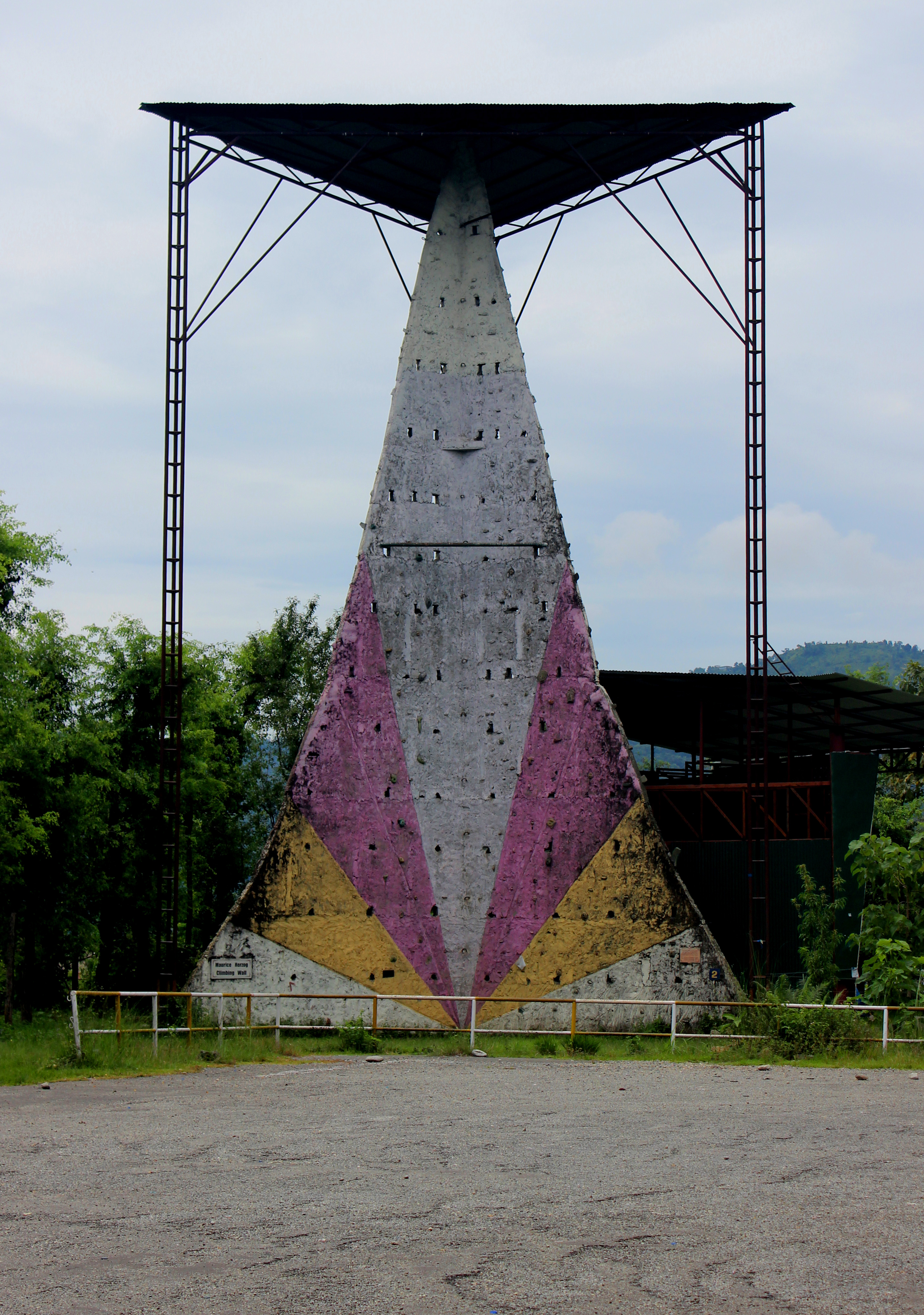
Maurice Herzog Climbing Wall located at the museum

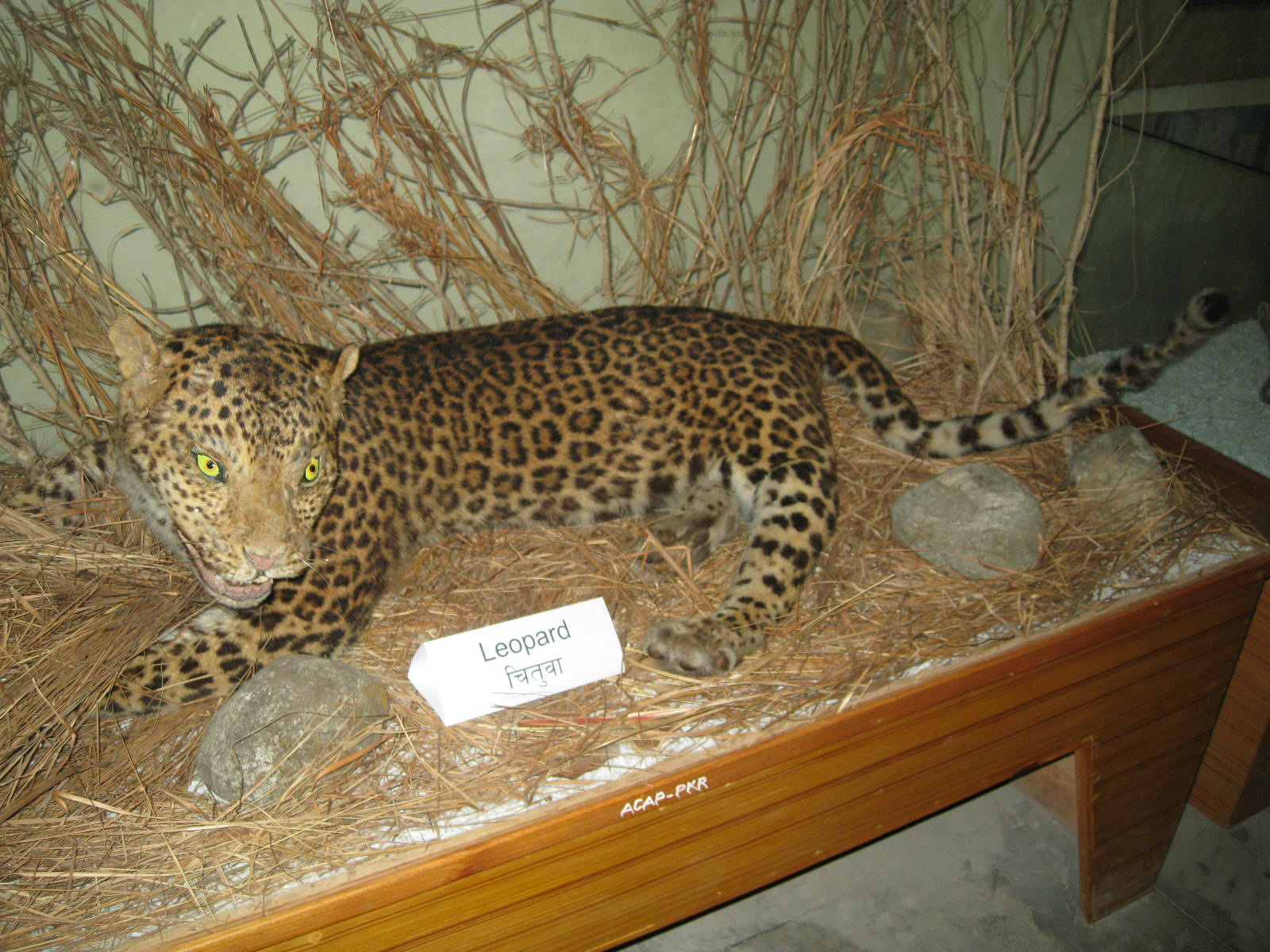
A taxidermied Nepal leopard

== See also ==
- List of museums in Nepal
- Indian subcontinent
- South Asia
