= Rambazar =

Rambazar रामबाजार
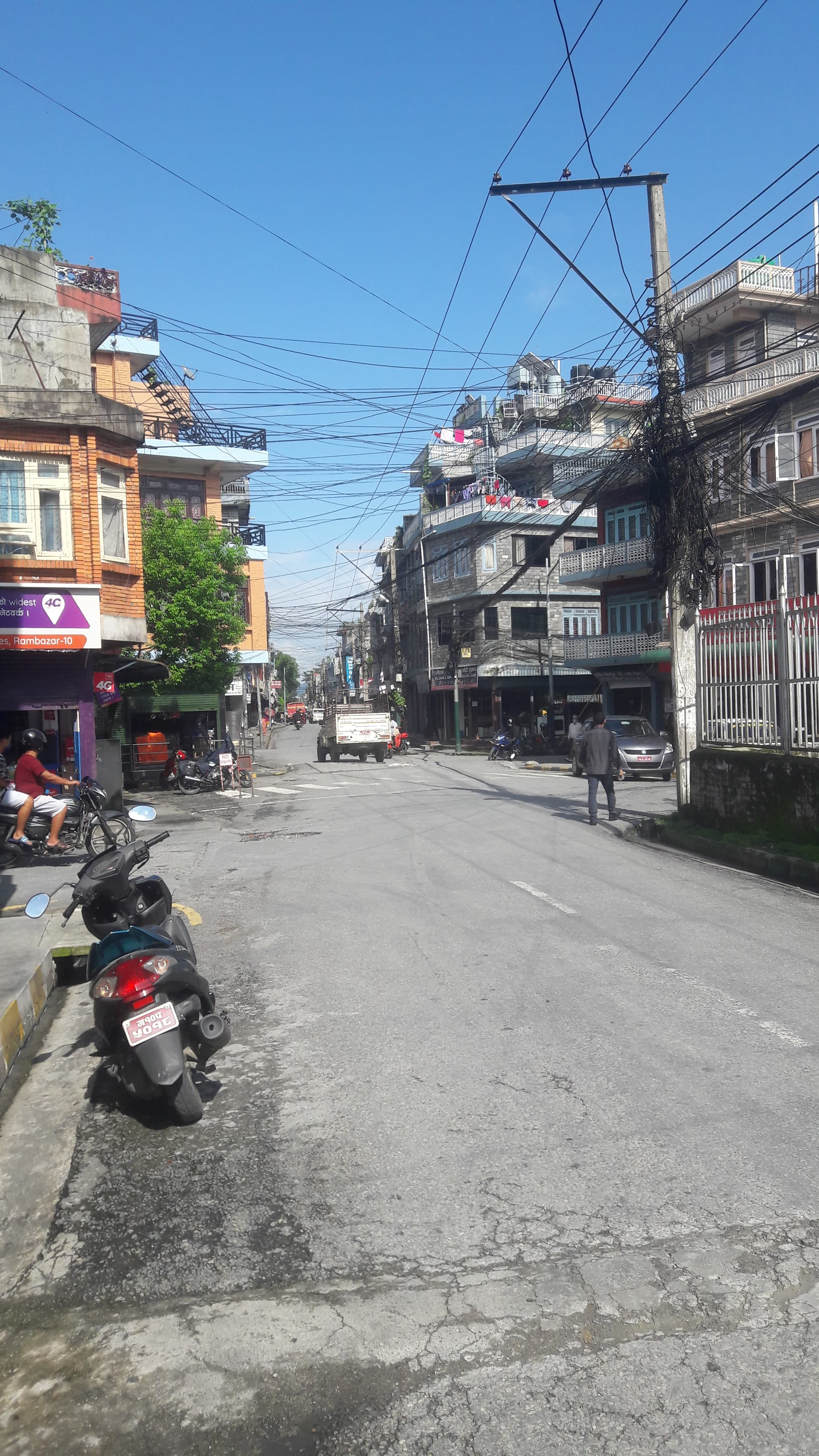

- Location in Nepal Rambazar (Nepal)
- Coordinates: 28°12′2.8872″N 83°59′50.0244″E
- Country: Nepal
- Province: Gandaki
- City: Pokhara
- Time zone: +5:45 (Nepali Time)
- Area code: 061

Rambazar (Nepali: रामबाजार) is the residential area which is located in Ward number 10 and 15 of Pokhara, Nepal.

== Boundaries of Rambazar ==
East: Birendra Chowk
West: SOS Village
North: Buddha Chowk
South: Nayagaun

== Education ==
SOS Hermann Gmeiner School Gandaki : SOS Children's Villages is the largest non-governmental organisation focused on supporting children without parental care and families at risk. It is located in Rambazar.

Nepal Bharat Maitri Vidyalaya

== Rambazar Police Station ==
Rambazar Police Station is located in Rambazar-10, Pokhara

== Transportation ==
Privately run public transport system operating throughout the city, adjoining townships and nearby villages. Pokhara Mahanagar Bus (green, brown and blue buses), Bindabashini Samiti (blue buses), Lekhnath Bus Bebasaya Samiti ( green and white buses) and Phewa Bus Bebasaya Samiti (mini micros) are public buses available in city. The public transport mainly consists of local and city buses, micros, micro-buses and metered-taxis.

== Indian Gorkha Pension Camp ==
Indian Gorkha Pension Camp is located in Rambazar. It was established in 1955 A.D.

== Ram Bazar Festival ==
Ram Bazar Festival is being held annually at Rambazar since 2012.

== Bank ==
- Shangri-la Development Bank, Rambazar Branch

== Office ==
- Classic Tech Internet operation center Rambazar

== Communication ==
Internet service providers in Rambazar are:

- Worldlink
- Nepal Telecom
- Vianet
- Classic Tech
