= Masbar =

Masbar is the name of ward number 7 in Pokhara metropolitan city in Nepal.
