= Batulechaur =

Batulechaur Batulechaur
- Subdivision of Pokhara Lekhnath Metropolitan City
- Location in Nepal Batulechaur (Nepal)
- Coordinates: 28.28°N 83.97°E
- Country: Nepal
- Zone: Gandaki Zone
- District: Kaski District

Population (1991)
  - Total: 5,019
- Time zone: UTC+5:45 (Nepal Time)

Batulechaur is Ward 16 of Pokhara Metropolitan City in Nepal. It consists of a small town and associated villages. Home to Mahendra Cave and Bat cave, Batulechaur is also called Cave City. At the time of the 1991 Nepal census, it had a population of 5,019.

== History ==
In September 1855, Prime Minister Jung Bahadur Rana mentioned in his letter to "Bicharis of Majhkhand Adalat in Pokhara" that there was an outbreak of leprosy in the Batulechaur area and that infected people be segregated from the main populace.
