= Pokhara =

Metropolitan city in Gandaki Province, Nepal

Pokhara पोखरा
- Metropolitan City
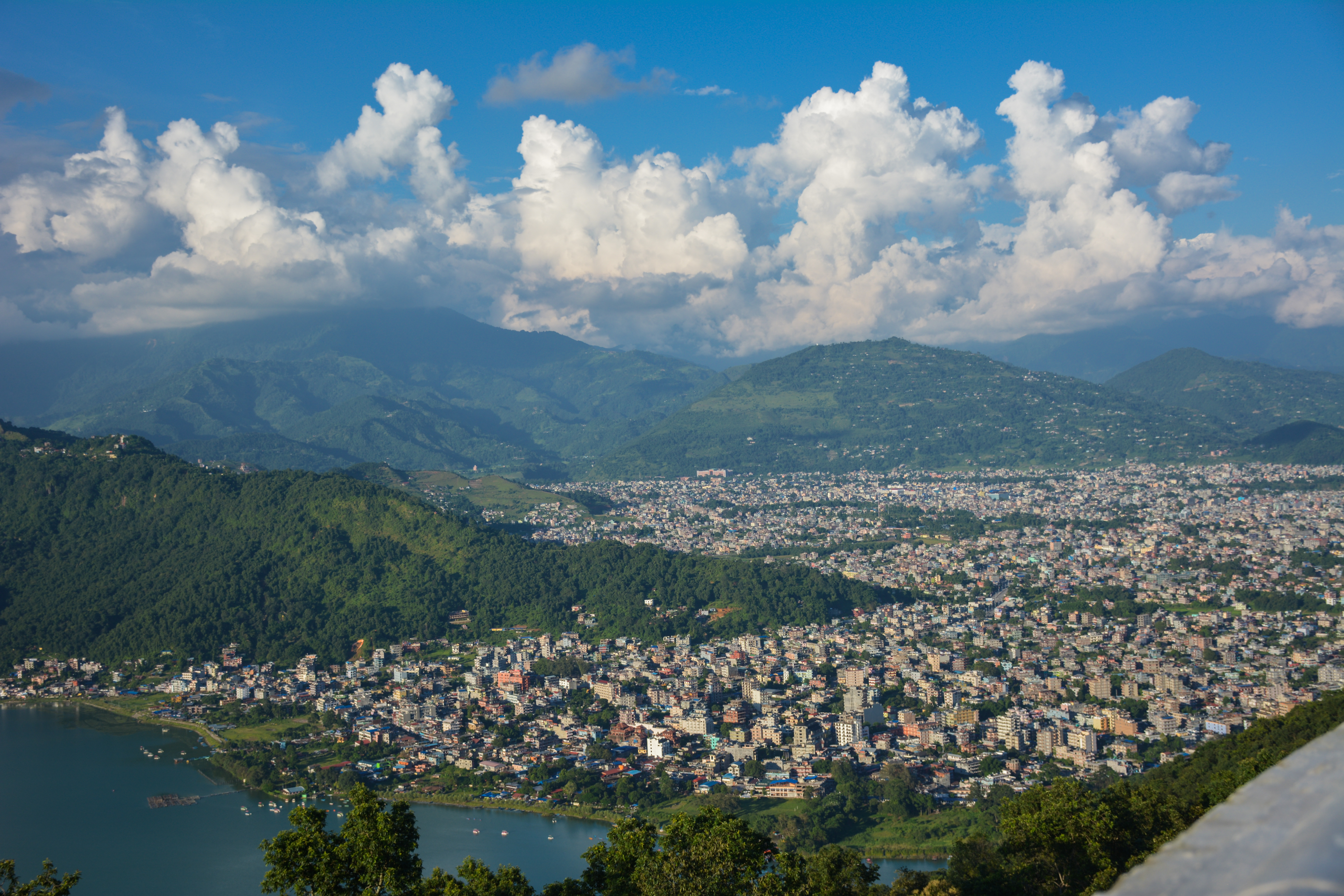
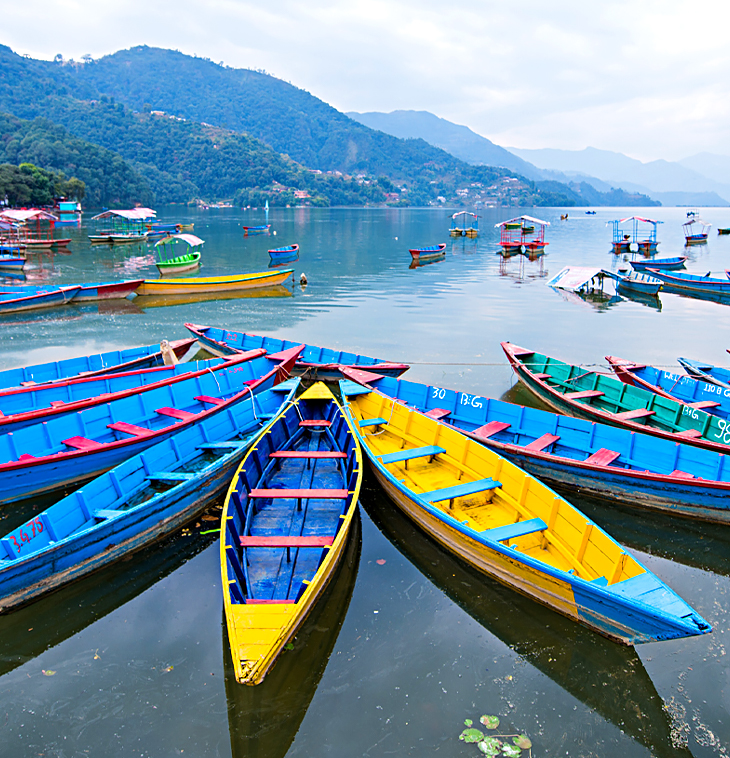
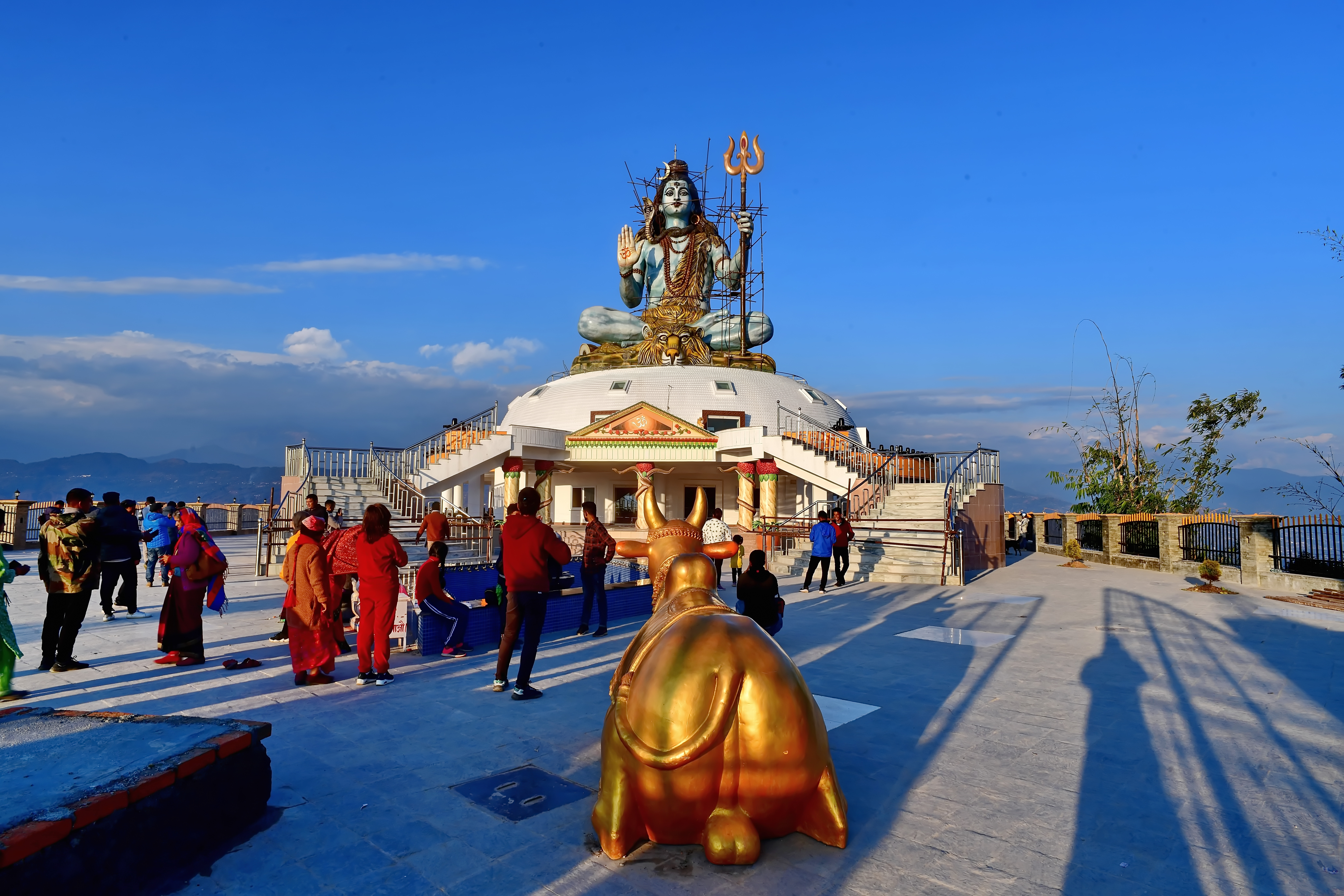
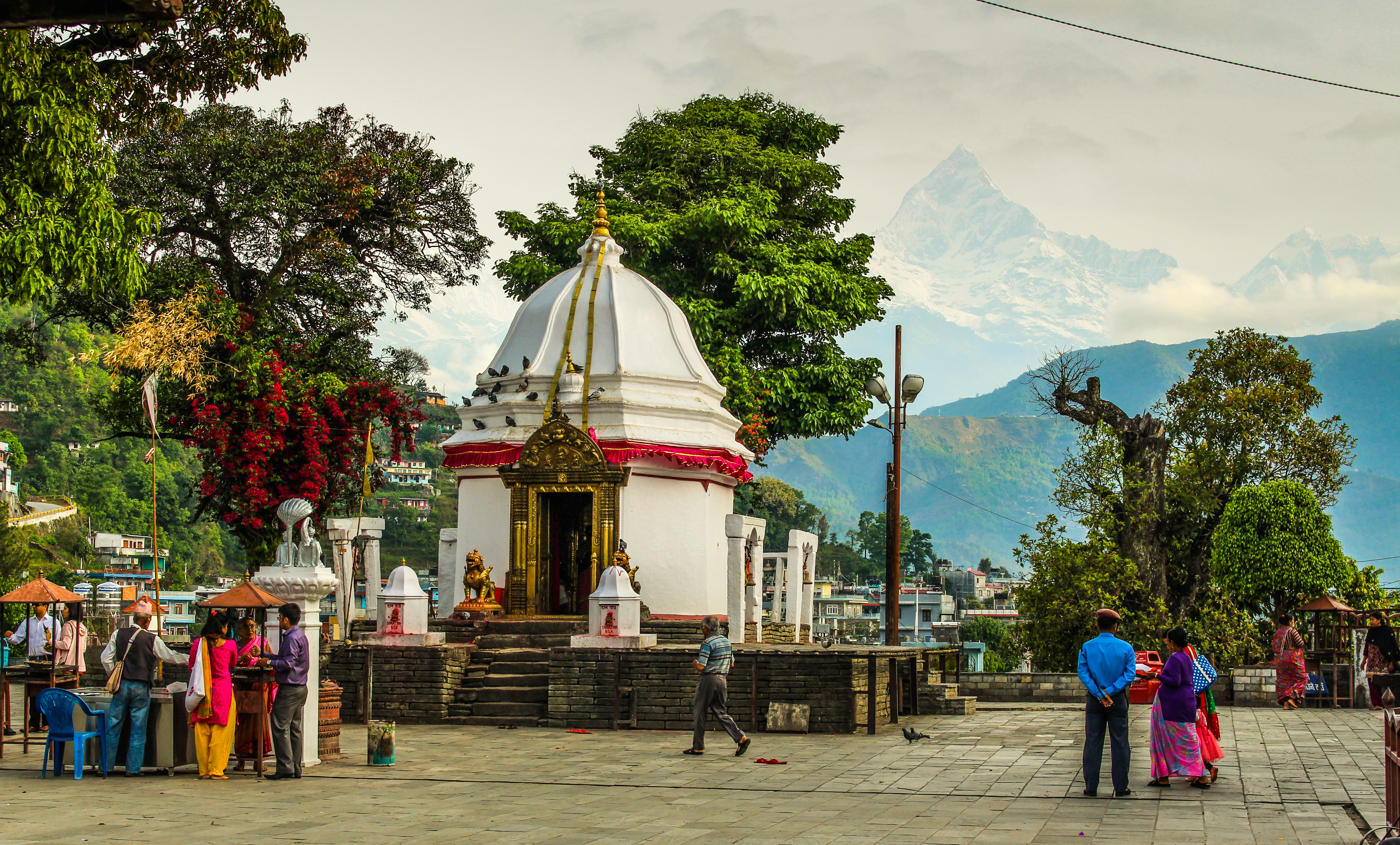
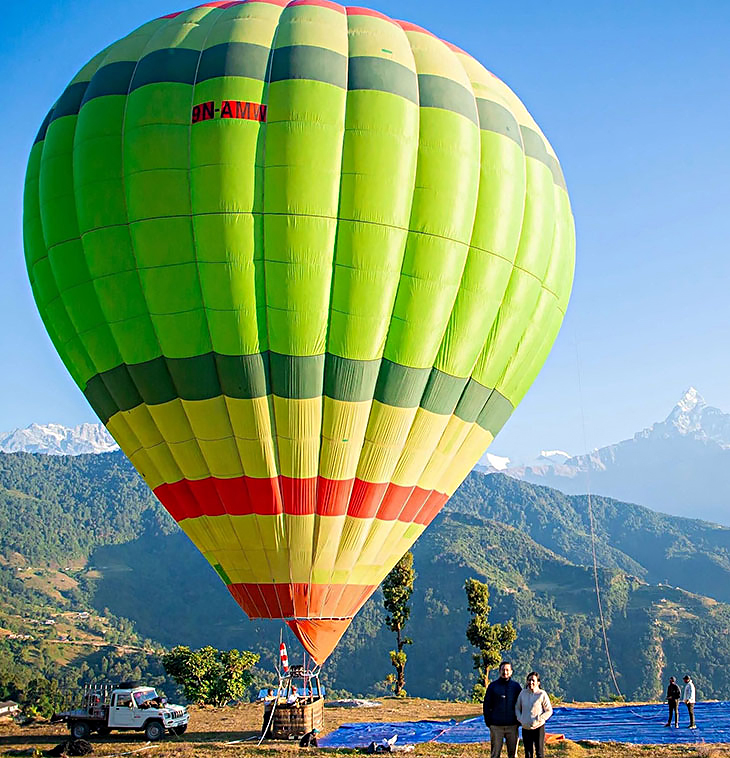
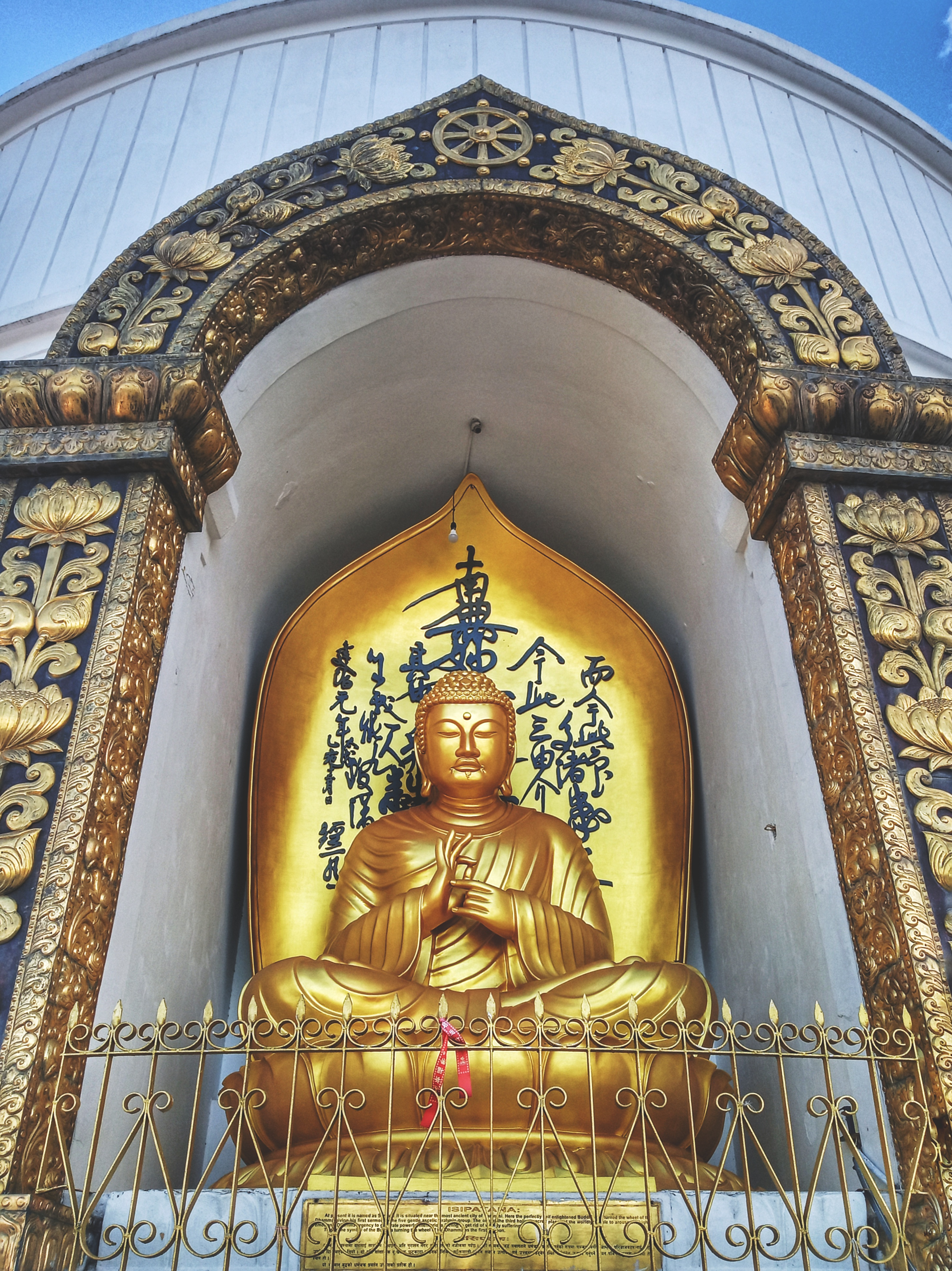
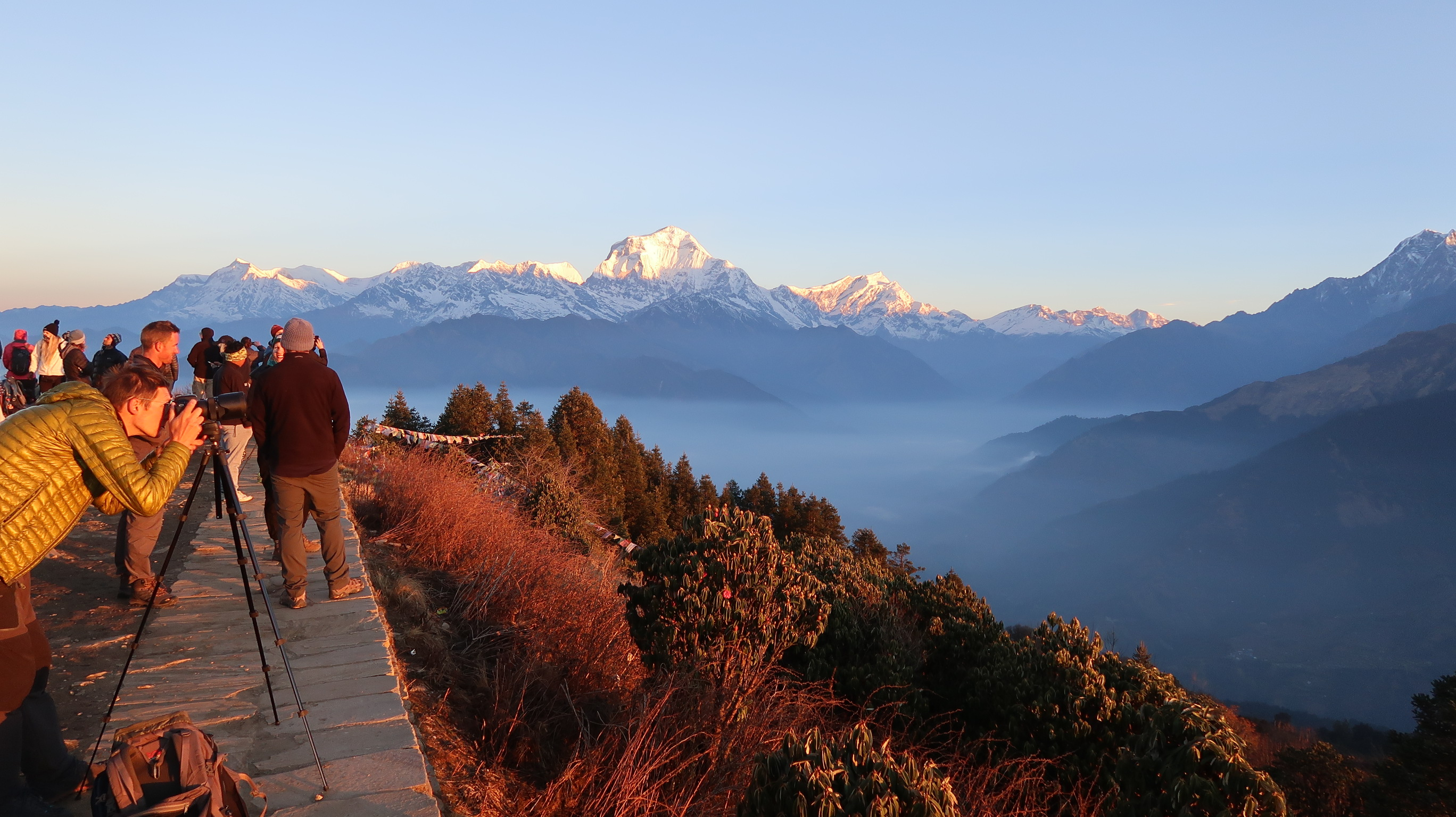
- Pokhara with Phewa lake Boats in Baidam International Mountain Museum Shiva Moorti Pumdikot Bindhyabasini Temple Sarangkot Pokhara Shanti Stupa Poon Hill Annapurna Cable Car

- Seal
- Nicknames: City of Lakes, Tourism Capital of Nepal
- Motto: Nepali: सफा पोखरा; हरियो पोखरा, lit. 'Clean Pokhara, Green Pokhara'
- Interactive map of Pokhara
- Location within Gandaki Province Location within Nepal
- Coordinates: 28°12′30″N 83°59′20″E
- Country: Nepal
- Province: Gandaki
- District: Kaski
- Incorporated: 1962
- No. of Wards: 33

Government
  - Type: Mayor-council
  - Body: Pokhara Metropolitan City Council
  - Mayor: Dhana Raj Acharya, CPN (Unified Socialist)
  - Deputy mayor: Manju Devi Gurung, CPN(UML)

Area
  - Total: 464.24 km^{2} (179.24 sq mi)
  - Water: 4.4 km^{2} (1.7 sq mi)
  - Rank: 1st
- Elevation: 822 m (2,697 ft)

Population (2021)
  - Total: 600,051
  - Rank: 2nd
  - Density: 1,292.5/km^{2} (3,347.7/sq mi)
  - Households: 120,594 (2nd most)
- Demonym: Pokhareli

Languages
  - Official: Nepali and (Other Language)

Ethnicities
  - Ethnicities: Bahun, Gurung, Chhetri, Magar, Newar,
- Time zone: UTC+5:45 (NST)
- Postal Codes: 33700 (WRPD), 33702, 33704, 33706, 33708, 33713
- Area code: 061
- Airports: Pokhara Int'l Airport; Pokhara Airport
- Website: pokharamun.gov.np

Pokhara (Nepali: पोखरा [ˈpokʰʌɾa]) is a metropolitan city located in central Nepal, which serves as the capital of Gandaki Province. Named the country's "capital of tourism" it is the second largest city after Kathmandu, with 600,051 inhabitants living in 120,594 households as of 2021 census.

Pokhara is located 200 kilometres (120 miles) west of the capital, Kathmandu, on the shore of Phewa Lake, and sits at an average elevation of approximately 822 m above sea level. The Annapurna Range, with three out of the ten highest peaks in the world—Dhaulagiri, Annapurna I and Manaslu—is within 15–35 mi (24–56 km) aerial range from the valley.

In 2024, Pokhara was declared as the tourism capital of Nepal, being a base for trekkers undertaking the Annapurna Circuit through the Annapurna Conservation Area region of the Annapurna ranges in the Himalayas. The city is also home to many of the elite Gurkha soldiers, soldiers native to South Asia of Nepalese nationality recruited for the British Army, Nepalese Army, Indian Army, Gurkha Contingent Singapore, Gurkha Reserve Unit Brunei, UN peacekeeping forces and in war zones around the world.

== Etymology ==
The Nepali word "pokhari" (Nepali: पोखरी, pronounced [ˈpokʰʌɾi]) means "pond"; pokhara is a local variant.

== History ==
By radiocarbon dating and investigating the alluvial deposits of Pokhara Valley, researchers have found that there were at least three large medieval earthquakes in 1000, 1255, and 1344 AD. Up to 9 cubic kilometres of conglomerates, massive mud and silt show indications of one or several megafloods that emanated from the Sabche Cirque in the Annapurna range. A more recent 2023 study, by a team of French scientists, estimated that a single landslide, dated approximately to 1190 AD, removed as much as 23 cubic kilometers of material from Annapurna IV - now 7525 meters high, but could have been as high as above 8000 meters prior to the catastrophic event - and sent most of it to where the City of Pokhara were to be built subsequently.

Pokhara lies on an important old trading route between China and India. In the 17th century, it was part of the Kingdom of Kaski which was one of the Chaubisi rajya (24 Kingdoms of Nepal, चौबिसे राज्य) ruled by a branch of the Shah dynasty. Many of the hills around Pokhara have medieval ruins from that time. In 1786, Prithvi Narayan Shah, the last ruler of the Gorkha Kingdom and first monarch of the Kingdom of Nepal, added Pokhara to his kingdom. It had by then become an important trading place on the routes from Kathmandu to Jumla and from India to Tibet.

The first settlement of the valley is theorized to have taken place when the first King of Kaski, Kulamandan Shah Khad (also called Bichitra Khan and Jagati Khan), made Batulechaur in the northern side of the valley his winter capital during the mid 14th century. The people settled here included Parajuli Brahmins, who were asked to look after the Bindhyabasini temple and were given some land in that locality as Birta. Dhobi Gauda was the first market center developed in Pokhara valley before the last King of Kaski brought sixteen families of Newars from Kathmandu (Bhaktapur) to develop the present-day market (i.e., old market) in the 1770s. Prior to that people were settled in the peripheral hills.

Pokhara was envisioned as a commercial center by the King of Kaski in the mid 18th century A.D. when Newars of Bhaktapur migrated to Pokhara, upon being invited by the king, they settled near the main business locations such as Bindhyabasini temple, Nalakomukh and Bhairab Tole. Most of Pokhara, at the time, was largely inhabited by Khas (Brahmin, Chhetri and Dalits), Gurungs, Magars and Thakuri.

At present, the Khas, Gurung (Tamu) and Magar form the dominant community of Pokhara. There is also a sizeable Newari population in the city. Batulechaur in the far north of Pokhara is home to the Gandharvas or Gaaineys (the tribe of the musicians).

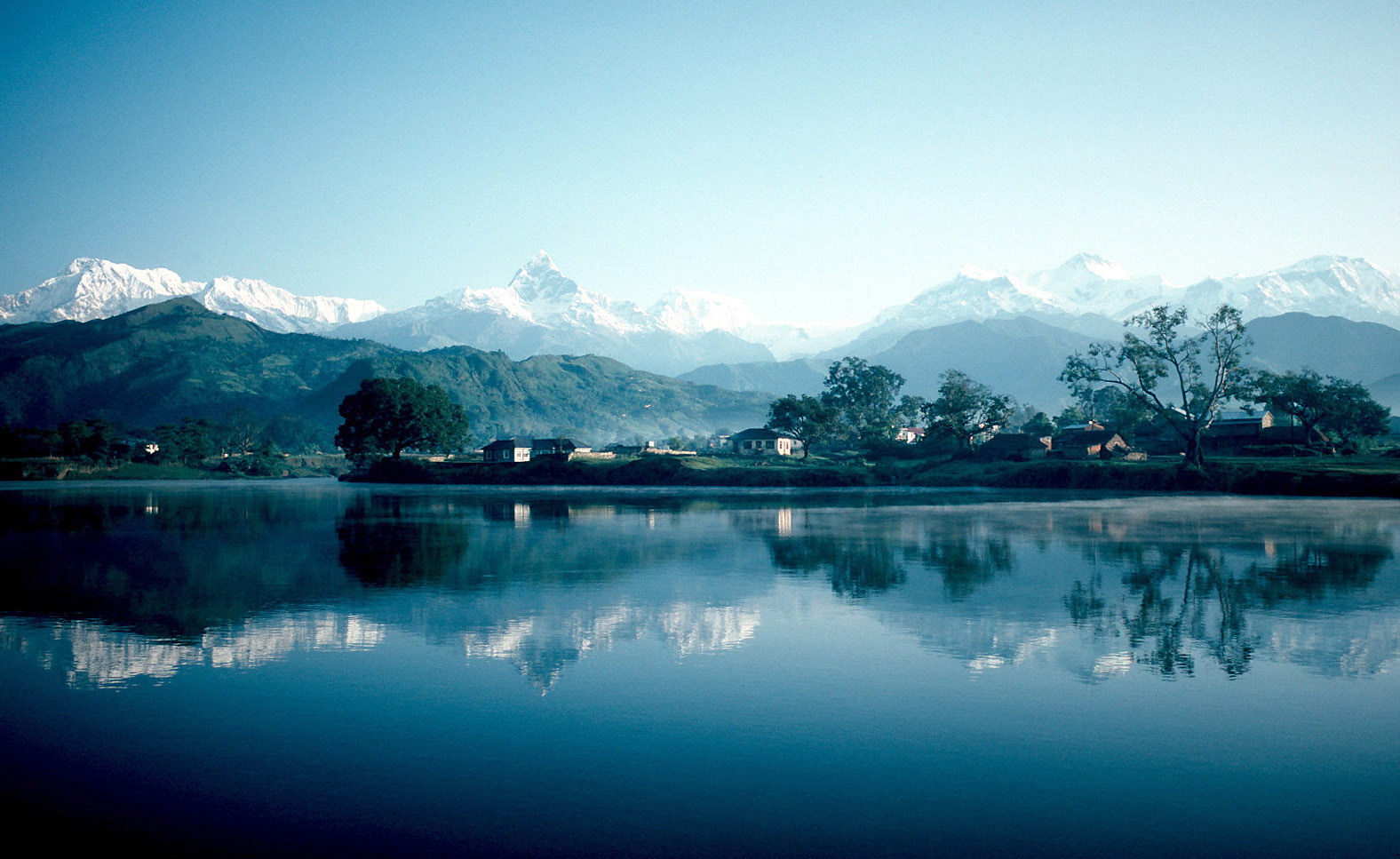
Phewa lake in 1982

The nearby hills around Pokhara are covered by Gurung villages with few places belonging to the Khas community. Magar communities are also present mostly in the southern outlying hills. A Newar community is almost non-existent in the villages of outlying hills outside the Pokhara city limits.

From 1959 to 1962, approximately 300,000 exiles entered Nepal from neighboring Tibet following its annexation by China. Most of the Tibetan exiles then sought asylum in Dharamshala and other Tibetan exile communities in India. According to UNHCR, since 1989, approximately 2500 Tibetans cross the border into Nepal each year, many of whom arrive in Pokhara typically as a transit to Tibetan exile communities in India. About 50,000–60,000 Tibetan exiles reside in Nepal, and approximately 20,000 of the exiled Tibetans live in one of the 12 consolidated camps, eight in Kathmandu and four in and around Pokhara. The four Tibetan settlements in Pokhara are Jampaling, Paljorling, Tashi Ling, and Tashi Palkhel. These camps have evolved into well-built settlements, each with a gompa (Buddhist monastery), chorten and its particular architecture, and Tibetans have become a visible minority in the city.

Until the end of the 1960s, the town was only accessible by foot and it was considered even more a mystical place than Kathmandu. The first road was completed in 1968 (Siddhartha Highway) after which tourism set in and the city grew rapidly. The area along the Phewa lake, called Lakeside, has developed into one of the major tourism hubs of Nepal.

== Geography ==
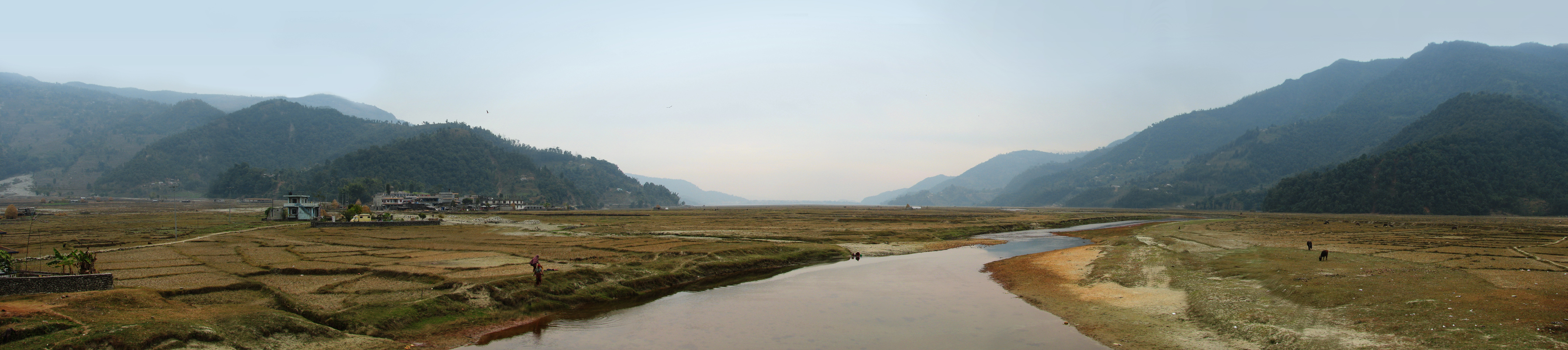
Middle Hills

Due to the high population density and the frequency of natural disasters, western Nepal is considered one of the most disaster-prone regions in the world. Pokhara is considered particularly vulnerable to earthquakes and floods because the Seti Gandaki River flows through the city. For example, the strongest earthquakes in the region include those of 2015 in Nepal.

Pokhara is in the northwestern corner of the Pokhara Valley, which is a widening of the Seti Gandaki valley that lies in the region (Pahad) of the Himalayas. In this region, the mountains rise very quickly, and within 30 kilometres (19 miles), the elevation rises from 1,000 to 7,500 metres (3,300 to 24,600 feet). As a result of this sharp rise in altitude the area of Pokhara has one of the highest precipitation rates in the country (3,350 mm/year or 131 inches/year in the valley to 5600 mm/year or 222 inches/year in Lumle). Even within the city, there is a noticeable difference in rainfall between the south and the north: The northern part at the foothills of the mountains experiences a proportionally higher amount of precipitation. The Seti Gandaki is the main river flowing through the city. The Seti Gandaki (White Gandaki) and its tributaries have created several gorges and canyons in and around Pokhara that give intriguingly long sections of terrace features to the city and surrounding areas. These long sections of terraces are interrupted by gorges that are hundreds of metres deep. The Seti gorge runs through Pokhara from north to south and then west to east; at places, these gorges are only a few metres wide. In the north and south, the canyons are wider.

In the south, the city borders Phewa Tal (or Phewa Lake) (4.4 km^{2}) at an elevation of about 800 metres (2,600 feet) above sea level, while north of Pokhara, the village of Lumle at 1,740 metres (5,710 feet) touches the base of the Annapurna mountain range. Pokhara, the city of lakes, is the second-largest city of Nepal after Kathmandu. Three 8,000-metre (26,000-foot) peaks (Dhaulagiri, Annapurna, Manaslu) can be seen from the city. The Machhapuchchhre (Fishtail) with an elevation of 6,993 metres (22,943 feet) is the closest to the city.

The porous underground of the Pokhara valley favors the formation of caves and several caves can be found within city limits and neighboring cities as well. In the south of the city, a tributary of the Seti Gandaki River flowing out of the Phewa Lake disappears at Patale Chhango (पाताले छाँगो, Nepali for Hell's Falls, also called Davis Falls, after someone who supposedly fell in) into an underground gorge, to reappear 500 metres (1,600 feet) further south.

=== Climate ===
The city has a humid subtropical climate; however, the elevation keeps temperatures moderate. Temperatures in summer average between 25 and 35 °C; in winter around −2 to 15 °C. Pokhara and nearby areas receive a high amount of precipitation. Lumle, 40 kilometres (25 miles) from Pokhara city center, receives the highest amount of rainfall (> 5600 mm/year or 222 inches/year) in the country. Snowfall is not observed in the valley, but surrounding hills experience occasional snowfall in the winter. Summers are humid and mild; most precipitation occurs during the monsoon season (June–September). Winter and spring skies are generally clear and sunny. The highest temperature ever recorded in Pokhara was 38.5 °C (101.3 °F) on 4 May 2013, while the lowest temperature ever recorded was 0.5 °C (32.9 °F) on 13 January 2012.

Climate data for Pokhara (Pokhara Airport), elevation 827 m (2,713 ft), (1991–2020 normals, extremes 1969–2020)
Month	Jan	Feb	Mar	Apr	May	Jun	Jul	Aug	Sep	Oct	Nov	Dec	Year
Record high °C (°F)	29.5 (85.1)	31.7 (89.1)	35.0 (95.0)	37.4 (99.3)	38.5 (101.3)	37.0 (98.6)	36.8 (98.2)	35.6 (96.1)	34.0 (93.2)	32.0 (89.6)	30.8 (87.4)	25.5 (77.9)	38.5 (101.3)
Mean daily maximum °C (°F)	19.9 (67.8)	22.7 (72.9)	27.1 (80.8)	30.0 (86.0)	30.4 (86.7)	30.8 (87.4)	30.4 (86.7)	30.5 (86.9)	29.9 (85.8)	27.9 (82.2)	24.4 (75.9)	21.0 (69.8)	27.1 (80.8)
Daily mean °C (°F)	13.5 (56.3)	16.2 (61.2)	20.1 (68.2)	23.1 (73.6)	24.6 (76.3)	26.0 (78.8)	26.4 (79.5)	26.4 (79.5)	25.5 (77.9)	22.6 (72.7)	18.4 (65.1)	14.7 (58.5)	21.5 (70.7)
Mean daily minimum °C (°F)	7.1 (44.8)	9.7 (49.5)	13.1 (55.6)	16.1 (61.0)	18.7 (65.7)	21.2 (70.2)	22.4 (72.3)	22.3 (72.1)	21.1 (70.0)	17.2 (63.0)	12.3 (54.1)	8.3 (46.9)	15.8 (60.4)
Record low °C (°F)	0.5 (32.9)	2.2 (36.0)	4.8 (40.6)	6.0 (42.8)	7.9 (46.2)	12.0 (53.6)	13.0 (55.4)	13.8 (56.8)	15.9 (60.6)	10.0 (50.0)	4.0 (39.2)	0.8 (33.4)	0.5 (32.9)
Average precipitation mm (inches)	21.6 (0.85)	35.1 (1.38)	63.7 (2.51)	141.7 (5.58)	354.7 (13.96)	648.2 (25.52)	941.0 (37.05)	839.4 (33.05)	635.0 (25.00)	159.2 (6.27)	17.2 (0.68)	11.5 (0.45)	3,868.3 (152.30)
Average precipitation days (≥ 1.0 mm)	2.4	3.8	6.4	10.5	18.3	22.2	25.6	24.3	19.4	8.0	1.3	1.0	143.2
Mean monthly sunshine hours	204.6	208.1	229.4	219.0	167.4	111.0	105.4	96.1	132.0	189.1	222.0	220.1	2,104.2
Mean daily sunshine hours	6.6	7.3	7.4	7.3	5.4	3.7	3.4	3.1	4.4	6.1	7.4	7.1	5.8
Source 1: World Meteorological Organization
Source 2: Department of Hydrology and MeteorologyFAO (sun 1971–2000)

== Demographics ==
At the time of the 2021 Nepal census, Pokhara Metropolitan City had a population of 599,504. Of these, 78.8% spoke Nepali, 11% Gurung, 2.4% Magar, 2.4% Newar, 1.4% Tamang, 0.8% Bhojpuri, 0.6% Hindi, 0.6% Maithili, 0.3% Tharu, 0.3% Urdu, 0.2% Magar Kham, 0.2% Rai, 0.2% Thakali, 0.1% Bengali, 0.1% Bhujel, 0.1% Chantyal, 0.1% Limbu and 0.1% other languages as their first language.

In terms of ethnicity/caste, 28.0% were Hill Brahmin, 16.1% Gurung, 15.4% Chhetri, 9.1% Magar, 6.8% Kami, 5.4% Newar, 3.3% Damai/Dholi, 2.8% Tamang, 2.0% Sarki, 1.4% Gharti/Bhujel, 1.4% Thakuri, 0.9% Badi, 0.9% Musalman, 0.9% Sanyasi/Dasnami, 0.8% Rai, 0.6% Tharu, 0.5% Kumal, 0.5% Thakali, 0.2% Chhantyal, 0.2% other Dalit, 0.2% Kalwar, 0.2% Kathabaniyan, 0.2% Sonar, 0.2% Teli, 0.1% Bengali, 0.1% Dura, 0.1% foreigners, 0.1% Gaine, 0.1% Ghale, 0.1% Hajjam/Thakur, 0.1% Halwai, 0.1% Koiri/Kushwaha, 0.1% Limbu, 0.1% Majhi, 0.1% Sherpa, 0.1% Sunuwar, 0.1% other Terai and 0.1% Yadav.

In terms of religion, 82.4% were Hindu, 13.2% Buddhist, 2.4% Christian, 0.9% Muslim, 0.6% Bon, 0.2% Prakriti, 0.1% Kirati and 0.2% others.

In terms of literacy, 84.3% could read and write, 1.4% could only read and 14.3% could neither read nor write.

Religion in Pokhara (2021)
Religion	Percent
Hinduism	82%
Buddhism	13%
Christianity	2%
Others	2%

Caste and Ethnic groups in Pokhara
1. Hill Brahman (28.0%)
2. Gurung (16.0%)
3. Chhetri (15.0%)
4. Magar (9.00%)
5. Kami (7.00%)
6. Newar (5.00%)
7. others (20.0%)

language in Pokhara
1. Nepali (79.0%)
2. Gurung (11.0%)
3. Magar (2.00%)
4. Newari (2.00%)
5. Others (6.00%)

Broad Caste and Ethnicity category (2011 Census)
Broad Ethnic Category	Sub Category	Linguistic Family	Population Percentage
Khas (Hill/Pahari Caste Groups)	Khas Brahmin, Chhetri, Kami, Thakuri, Damai Sarki, Sanyasi/Dasnami	Indo-Aryan	58.1%
Janajati (Hill Tribal Groups)	Gurung, Magar, Tamang, Sherpa, Rai, Limbu etc	Sino-Tibetan	33.5%
Newar (Kathmandu Valley Caste Groups)	Newari Brahmin, Shrestha, Tamrakar, Newar Buddhist, Maharjan, Rajkarnikar etc	Indo-Aryan And Sino-Tibetan	5.4%
Madeshi (Terai Caste Groups)	Yadav, Maithil Brahmins, Chamar, Kushwaha, Musahar, Kurmi, Dhanuk etc	Indo-Aryan	1.1%
Muslim	–	Indo-Aryan	1%
Adibasi (Terai Indigenous Groups)	Tharu, Rajbanshi, Tajpuriya etc	Indo-Aryan And Sino-Tibetan	0.6%
Others	–	–	0.3%

== Economy ==
Since the 1990s, Pokhara has experienced rapid urbanization. As a result, service-sector industries have increasingly contributed to the local economy overtaking the traditional agriculture. An effect of urbanization is seen in high real estate prices, among the highest in the country. The major contributors to the economy of Pokhara are manufacturing and service sector including tourism; agriculture and the foreign and domestic remittances. Tourism, service sector and manufacturing contributes approximately 58% to the economy, remittances about 20% and agriculture nearly 16%.

== Hydroelectric power plants ==
Pokhara has a number of hydroelectric power plants.

- Fewa Hydropower Station
- Seti Hydropower Station
- Bijayapur-I Small Hydropower Project
- Bijaypur Khola-2 Hydropower Project (under Construction)

== Temples, Biharas and churches ==
There are numerous temples, gumbas (Buddhist monasteries) and churches in and around Pokhara valley. Many temples serve as combined places of worship for Hindus and Buddhists. Some of the popular temples, gumbas and churches are:

- Tal Barahi Temple (located on the island in the middle of Phewa Lake)
- Bindhyabasini temple
- World peace pagoda
- Pumdikot Shiva Statue
- Bhadrakali Temple
- Matepani Gumba
- Akala Devi Temple
- Nepal Christiya Ramghat Church, established in 1952 A.D. (2009 BS), the first-ever church in Nepal
- Bhimsen Temple

== Location ==
Wards of Pokhara

Ward No	Administrative Ward	Population (2021 Census)
1	Bagar	13,947
2	Miruwa	10,100
3	Nadipur	8,284
4	Gairapatan	9,152
5	Malepatan	22,325
6	Baidam	14,455
7	Masbar	16,139
8	Shrijana Chowk	25,439
9	Naya Bazar	15,981
10	Amarsingh	18,435
11	Ranipauwa	17,594
12	Sital Devi	12,710
13	Miya Patan	22,399
14	Majheripatan	31,561
15	Rambazar	24,406
16	Batulechaur	24,465
17	Birauta	46,005
18	Sarangkot	12,945
19	Lamachaur, Puranchaur	13,855
20	Bhalam	3,936
21	Nirmal Pokhari	9,070
22	Pumdi Bhumdi	7,596
23	Chapakot	4,276
24	Kaskikot	5,950
25	Hemja	17,597
26	Budhi Bazar	16,777
27	Tal Chowk	16,377
28	Kalika	4,224
29	Bhandardhik	16,257
30	Khudi	16,192
31	Begnas	8,702
32	Gagangauda	14,683
33	Bharat Pokhari	11,670
	TOTAL	513,504

The municipality of Pokhara spans 12 kilometres (7.5 miles) from north to south and 6 kilometres (3.7 miles) from east to west but, unlike the capital Kathmandu, it is quite loosely built up and still has much green space. Nepal The gorge through which the river flows is crossed at five places: K.I. Singh Pool, Mahendrapul and Prithvi Highway Pool from north to south of the city. The floor of the valley is plain, resembles Terai due to its gravel-like surface, and has slanted orientation from northwest to southeast. The city is surrounded by the hills overlooking the entire valley.

Phewa Lake was slightly enlarged by damming which poses a risk of silting up due to the inflow during the monsoon. The outflowing water is partially used for hydropower generation at Fewa Hydropower Station. The dam collapsed in 1974 which resulted in draining of its water and exposing the land leading to illegal land encroachment; since then the dam has been rebuilt. The power plant is about 100 metres (330 feet) below at the bottom of the Phusre Khola gorge. Water from Phewa is diverted for irrigation into the southern Pokhara valley. The eastern Pokhara Valley receives irrigation water through a canal running from a reservoir by the Seti in the north of the city. Some parts of Phewa lake are used as commercial cage fisheries. The lake is currently being encroached upon by invasive water hyacinth (जलकुम्भी झार).

In 2017, Pokhara Lekhnath Metropolitan City became Nepal's largest metropolitan city by area, occupying 464.24 km^{2} (179.24 sq mi)—which means the city is nine times larger than Kathmandu, 18 times larger than Lalitpur and 2.5 times larger than Bharatpur.

Pokhara is known to be a popular tourist destination for visitors from all over the world. Every year, many people visit the location in order to travel to the Annapurna range and famous religious place muktinath. The tourist district is along the north shore of the Phewa lake (Baidam, Lakeside, and Damside). It is mainly made up of small shops, non-star tourist hotels, restaurants, and bars. Most upscale and starred hotels are on the southern shore of the Phewa Lake and southeastern fringes of the city where there are more open lands and unhindered view of the surrounding mountains. Most of the tourists visiting Pokhara trek to the Annapurna Base Camp and Mustang. To the east of the Pokhara valley, there are seven smaller lakes such as Begnas Lake, Rupa Lake, Khaste lake, Maidi lake, Neureni lake, Dipang lake. Begnas Lake is known for its fishery projects.

== Tourism ==
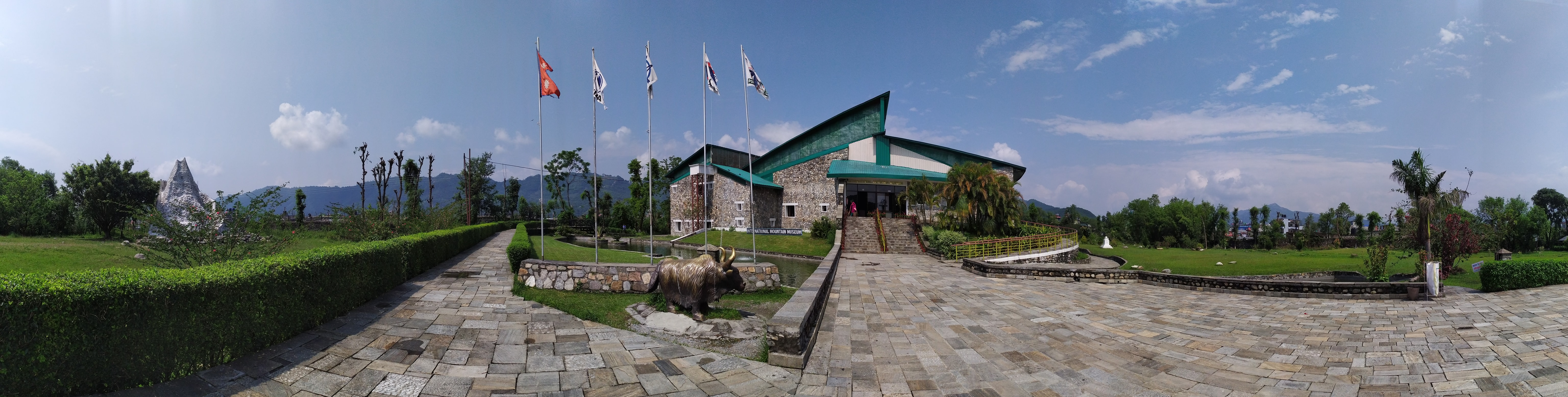
International Mountain Museum at Ratopahiro, Pokhara

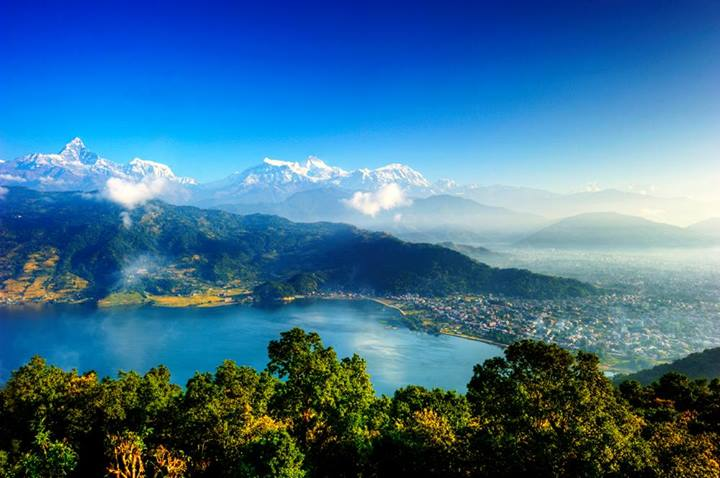
View of Phewa lake and Pokhara from Shanti Stupa

After the occupation of Tibet by China in 1950 and the Indo-China war in 1962, the old trading route to India from Tibet through Pokhara became defunct. Today only a few caravans from Mustang arrive in Bagar.

Aerial view of Fewa Lake and lake Side Street, Pokhara

In recent decades, Pokhara has become a major tourist destination: it is considered the tourism capital of Nepal, mainly for adventure tourism and the base for the famous Annapurna Circuit trek. Thus, a major contribution to the local economy is made by the tourism and hospitalities industry. Tourism is the primary source of income for local people and the city. There are two 5-star hotels and approximately 305 other hotels that includes one 4-star, five 3-star, fifteen 2-star and non-star hotels in the city. The city promotes two major hilltops as viewpoints to see the city and surrounding panorama: World Peace Pagoda, built in 1996 across the southern shore of Phewa Lake and Sarangkot, which is northwest of the city. In February 2004, International Mountain Museum (IMM) was opened for public in Ratopahiro to boost the city's tourism. Other museums are Pokhara Regional Museum; an ethnographic museum; Annapurna Natural History Museum which houses preserved specimens of flora and fauna, and contains a particularly extensive collection of the butterflies, found in the Western and Annapurna Conservation Area region of Nepal; and Gurkha Museum featuring the history of the Gurkha soldiers.

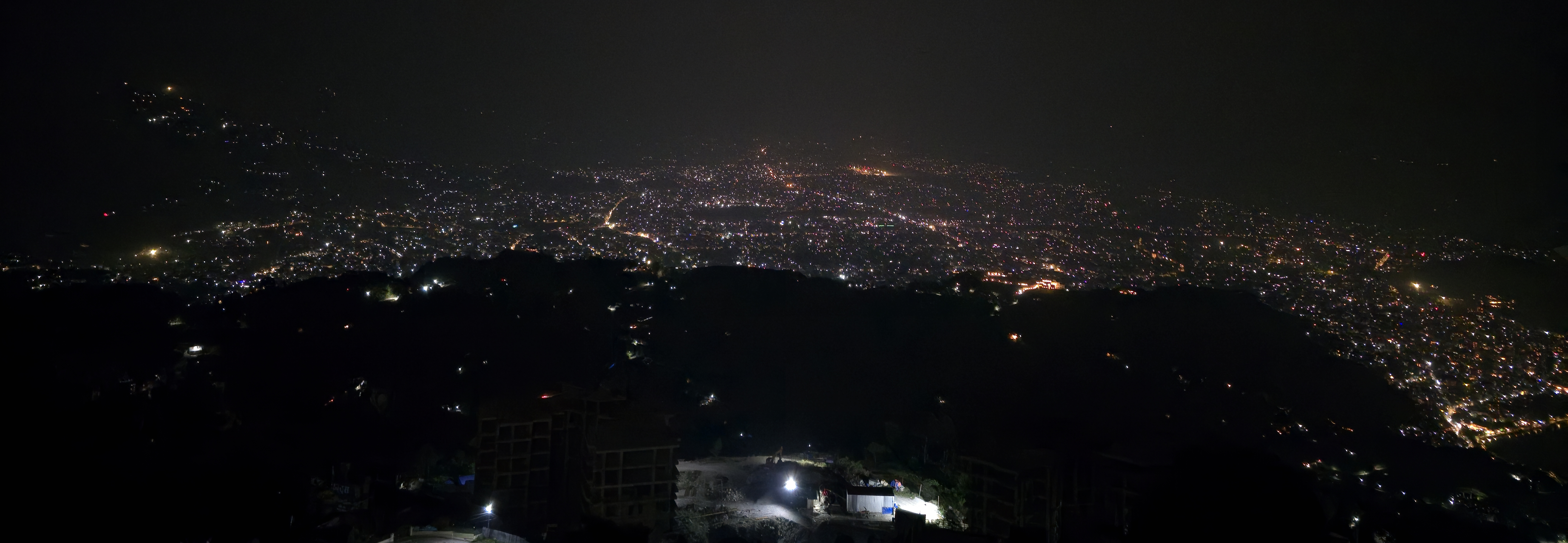
Aerial Night View of Pokhara from Sarangkot (2026)

=== Cable cars ===
Annapurna Cable Car

Annapurna Cable Car takes tourists from Lakeside to Sarangkot and back. Another one being built will connect Phewa Lake with World Peace Stupa. Both are mostly used for tourism and sightseeing, rather than regular commuting.

== Military ==
The Pokhara region has a very strong military tradition with a significant number of its men being employed by the Nepali army. The Western Division HQ of the Nepalese Army is stationed at Bijayapur, Pokhara and its Area of Responsibility (AOR) consists of the entire Western Development Region of Nepal. The AOR of this division is 29,398 km^{2} and a total of 16 districts are under the division. The population of the AOR of Western Division is 4,571,013. Both the British Army and the Indian Army have regional recruitment and pensioners facilitation camps in Pokhara. The British Gurkha Camp is located at Deep Heights in the northeast of the Pokhara city and the Indian Gorkha Pension Camp is on the south-western side of the city, Rambazar.

== Electricity and water supply ==
Electricity in Pokhara is regulated and distributed by the NEA Nepal Electricity Authority. Water supply and sanitation facilities are provided by the Nepal Water Supply Corporation (NWSC).

== Education ==
Pokhara has more than eight hundred private and public high educational institutions. There are several institutions of higher learning up to the doctorate level in social sciences, business, and science and technology.

== Transportation ==
=== Public transit ===
Pokhara has extensive privately operated public transportation system running throughout the city, adjoining townships and nearby villages. Pokhara Mahanagar Bus Bebasaya Samiti (green, brown and blue buses), Mama Bhanja Transport (blue buses), Bindabashini Samiti (blue buses), Phewa Bus Bebasaya Samiti (mini micros) and Lekhnath Bus Bebasaya Samiti (green and white buses) are the private companies that provide public bus transportation facility in and around Pokhara Valley. The public transport mainly consists of local and city buses, micros, micro-buses and metered-taxis.

=== Boating ===
Boating is a required form of transport to get to the Tal Barahi Temple. Besides that, boating can also be used as an alternative to ascending then descending some hills to get to the opposite bank of the lakes in the city.

Boating is most prominent in the Phewa Lake and Begnas Lake with over 750 boats in Phewa Lake and over 250 boats in Begnas Lake.

=== Intercity connections ===
==== Ground connections ====
Pokhara is well connected to the rest of the country through permanent roads such as the Prithivi highway, Siddhartha highway, Bhupi Sherchan marg (Part of Pushpalal highway), and other roads. The main mode of transportation are Cars, Motorbikes, Public Buses, Taxis and the Purano Bus Park is the main hub for buses plying countrywide.

==== Aviation ====
So far, Pokhara is the only city in Nepal with two operational airports.

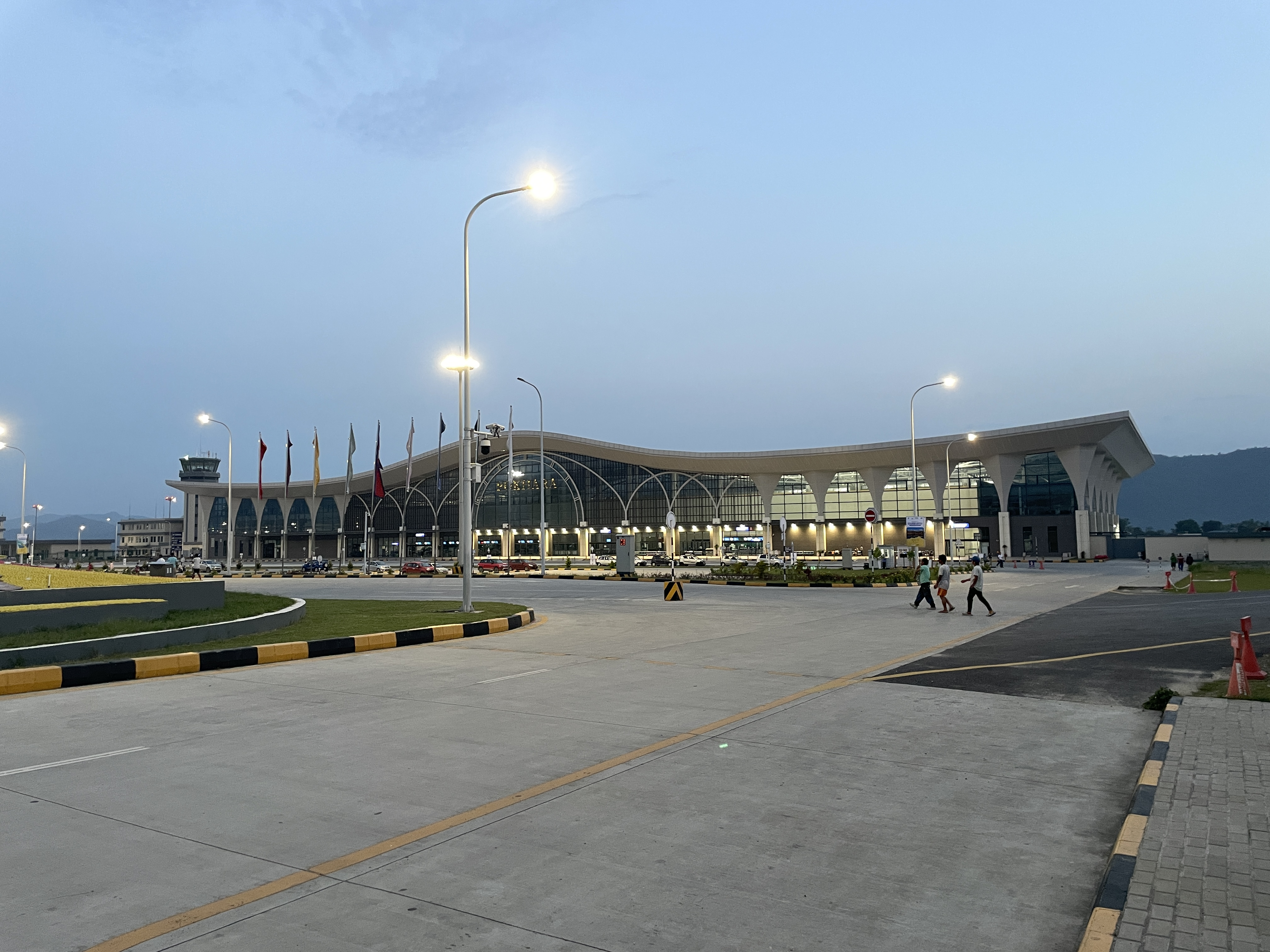
pokhara international airport

The Pokhara Regional International Airport (PHH) opened 1 January 2023. Domestic airlines operate there. However, as of April 2025, only one international airline serves the airport. Himalaya airlines operates one regular commercial flight a week on the Kathmandu-Lhasa-Pokhara-Lhasa-Kathmandu route, but more than a dozen chartered flights (commercial and non-commercial) have been hosted from China, Bhutan, and India. The commercial chartered flights have been hosted mainly in the year of 2025, indicating possible expansion of more regular flights.

Most operations from the old Pokhara airport (PKR) were transferred to the new airport on 1 January 2023, the domestic operations to Jomsom, helicopters, and ultralights are still operated from this airport in 2025. This airport is more busy in the morning time when the mountains to the north of the valley are visible.

Flight duration from Kathmandu to Pokhara is approximately 30 minutes.

== Water bodies ==
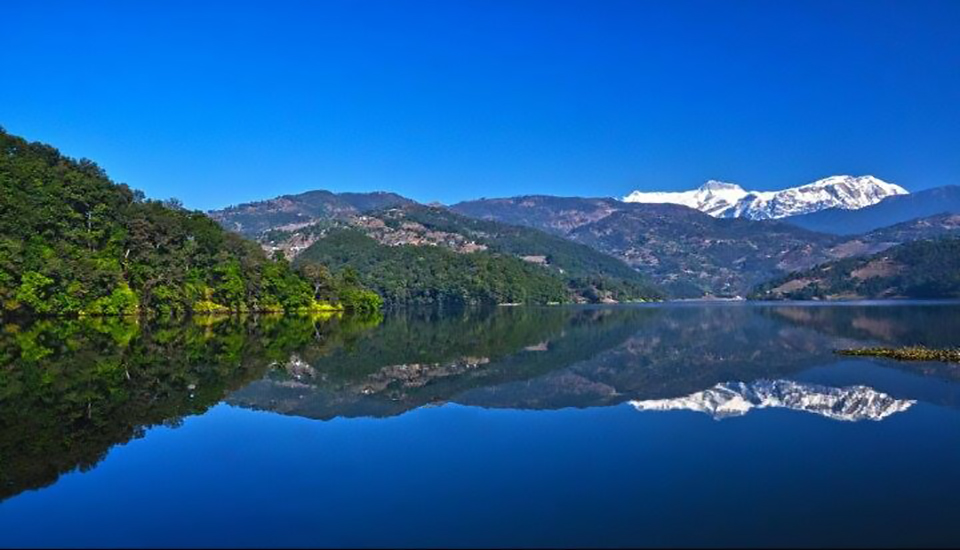
Begnas lake lies in the east of Pokhara valley

Pokhara valley is rich in water sources. The major bodies of water in and around Pokhara are:

=== Lakes ===
- Phewa Lake, Begnas Lake, Rupa Lake, Dipang Lake, Khaste lake, Maidi Tal, Niureni Tal, Gude Tal, Kamal Pokhari Tal, Kashyap Tal (Thuli Pokhari)

=== Rivers ===
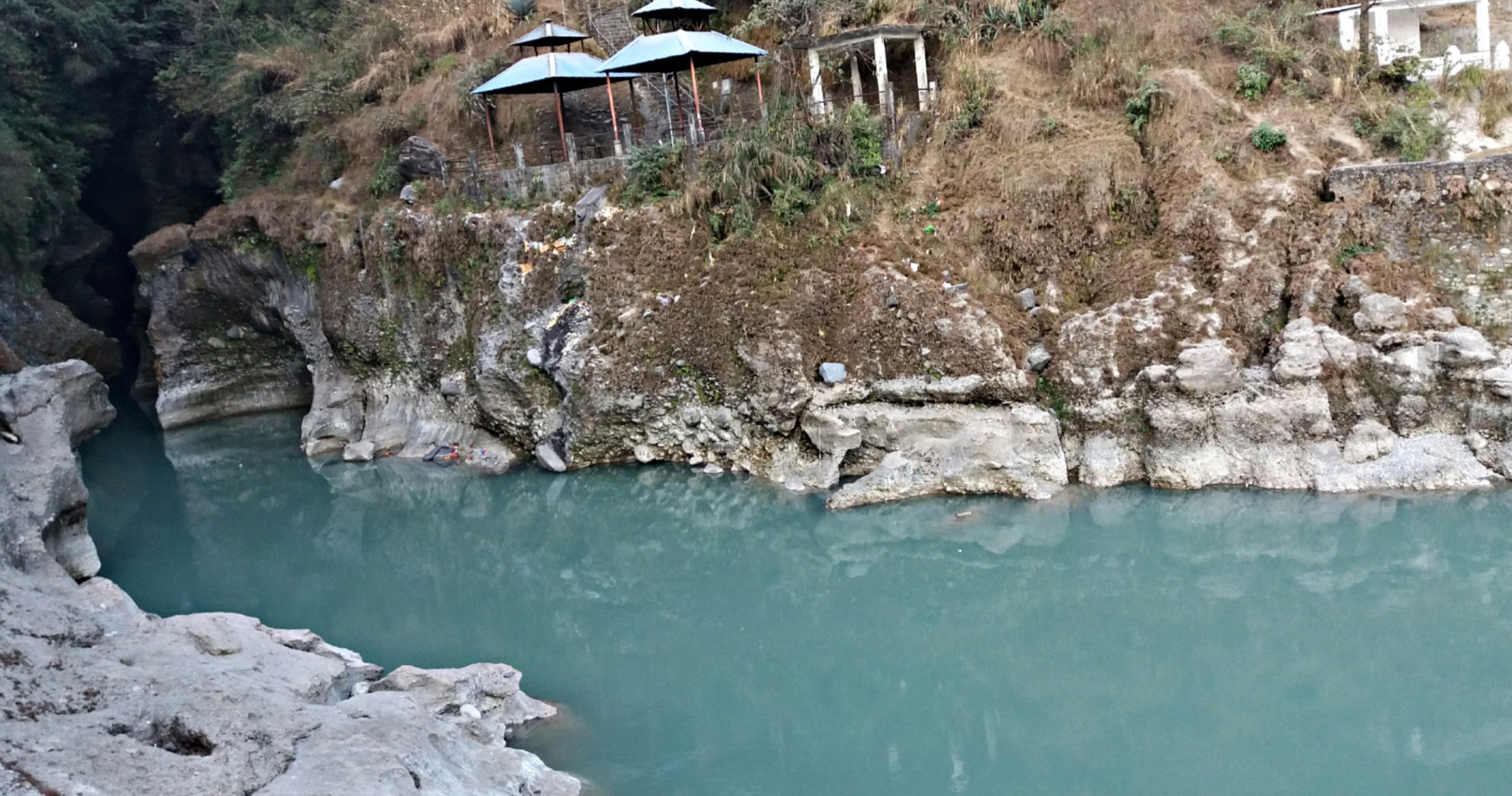
Seti river in ramghat Pokhara

- Seti Gandaki (Seti Khola), Kahun Khola, Bijaypur Khola, Furse Khola, Kali Khola, Yamdi Khola, Mardi River, Harpan Khola, Hadi Khola, Khudi Khola.

== Sports and recreation ==
The sporting activities are mainly centered in the multipurpose stadium Pokhara Rangasala (or Annapurna Stadium) in Rambazar. The popular sports are football, cricket, volleyball, basketball, martial arts, etc. The Sahara Club is one of the most active organizations promoting football in the city and organizes a South Asian club-level annual tournament: the Aaha Gold Cup. Additionally, the Kaski District Football Association (KDFA) organizes Safal Pokhara Gold Cup, which is also a South Asian club-level tournament and ANFA organizes local Kaski district club-level Balram KC memorial football tournament. B-13, Sangam & LG are the powerhouse Football club in Pokhara. There are several tennis courts. Himalayan Golf Course has attracted international press for its unique design. At 1100 meters, on the way, near Sarangkot hill, high mountain sports activity, paragliding is a good attraction for tourists as well as domestic tourists for adventure activities Nearby Sarangkot hill has developed as a good attraction for adventure activities such as paragliding and skydiving. The Pokhara city marathon, high altitude marathon are some activities attracting mass participation. Adventure sports such as base jumping, paragliding, canyoning, rock climbing, bungee jumping, etc. are targeted towards tourists. The Pokhara Rhinos cricket team represented the city in the Everest Premier League; in the Nepal Premier League, the city's team is the Pokhara Avengers.

== Music ==
The universal instruments used in Nepalese music include the madal (small leather drum), bansuri (bamboo flute), and saarangi. These instruments are prominent features of the traditional folk music (lok gít or lok geet) in Pokhara, which is actually the western (Gandaki, Dhaulagiri and Lumbini) branch of Nepali lok geet. Some examples of music of this region are Resham Firiri (रेशम फिरिरी) and Khyalee Tune (ख्याली धुन).

The lok geet started airing in Radio Nepal during the 1950s and artists such as Jhalakman Gandharva, Dharma Raj Thapa are considered pioneers in bringing the lok git into mass media. During early and late 1990s, bands from Pokhara like Nepathya started their very successful fusion of western rock and pop with traditional folk music. Since then several other musical groups in Nepal have adopted the lok-pop/rock style producing dozens of albums every year.

Another important part of cultural music of western Nepal, and hence Pokhara, is the Panché Baaja (पञ्चे बाजा), a traditional musical band performed generally during marriage ceremonies by the damaai musicians.

The musical culture in Pokhara is quite dynamic and in recent years, Western rock and roll, pop, rap and hip-hop are becoming increasingly popular with frequently held musical concerts; however, the traditional lok and modern (semi-classical) Nepali music are predominantly favored by the general population. More musical concerts are held in Pokhara than in any other city in the country.

== Media and communications ==
Media and communication were quite limited until the 1990s. However, in the following decade there has been a proliferation of private media in print, radio and television. There are 19 privately owned local FM stations in the Pokhara valley. An additional 4 FM stations from Kathmandu have their relay broadcast stations in Pokhara. There are six community radio stations and five television stations.

Approximately 14 national daily newspapers in Nepali are published in the city, along with several other weekly and monthly news magazines. All major national newspapers published in Kathmandu have distributions in Pokhara. A number of online news portals are also updated from Pokhara, as well as some entertainment-based websites. Popular technology based web-magazine TechSansar also started in Pokhara.

Pokhara has got 4G network of Nepal Telecom, Smart Cell and Ncell. The majority of the people in the city access internet through mobiles, numerous cyber cafes, and local wireless ISPs. Most tourist restaurants and hotels also provide WiFi services. Wi-Fi hotspots by Nepal Telecom using Wi-MAX technology were launched in February 2014, and are accessible in most parts of the city for a fee. Subscriber based internet is provided by several private ISP providers.

== International relations and organizations ==
=== Twin towns – sister cities ===
Pokhara is twinned with:

- Barnet, England, United Kingdom
- Guangzhou, China
- Ithaca, United States
- Komagane, Japan
- Kunming, China
- Nyingchi, China
- Princes' Islands, Turkey

== Notable people from Pokhara ==
People who live or have lived in Pokhara City are known as Pokhareli. In demographic terms, the Gurung people are the dominant ethnic group, hailing from the hills around Pokhara such as Sikles, Armala, Ghalel gaun, Ghandruk, Lumle etc., with Brahmin from Syangja, Newar and Magar making up the rest of Pokhara's population. Pokhara also has the highest number of Gurkha soldiers, the majority of them belonging to Gurung and Magar ethnic groups, who were categorized as martial race by the British Army.

== See also ==
- Pokhara Valley
- Kaski District
- Pumdikot
- 2022 Pokhara municipal election
