= Bijayapur Khola =

River tributary in Nepal

Coordinates: 28°09′21″N 84°02′16″E

The Bijayapur Khola is a tributary of the Seti Gandaki River in Pokhara, in central Nepal.
