= Mohariya Tole =

Neighborhood of Pokhara, Nepal

Mohariya Tole Nepali: मोहरिया टोल
- Neighbourhood
- Interactive map of Mohariya Tole
- Coordinates: 28°14′10″N 83°59′07″E
- Country: Nepal
- Province: Gandaki Province
- District: Kaski District
- Municipality: Pokhara Metropolitan City
- Ward: Ward 2 (bordering Wards 1 and 3)

Mohariya Tole (Nepali: मोहरिया टोल) is one of the oldest neighbourhoods in Pokhara, located within Ward No. 2 of Pokhara Metropolitan City in Kaski District, Gandaki Province, Nepal. The area is known for its cultural attractions, including the Bindhyabasini Temple, and was a prominent commercial hub before 1960.

== Location ==
Mohariya Tole is centrally located in the old part of Pokhara and is bordered by several historic neighbourhoods:

- Bagar to the north (Ward 1).
- Bhairab Tole to the south (Ward 2).
- Nadipur to the east (Ward 3).
- Pokhara Baglung Highway and Miruwa to the west (Ward 2).

== History ==
The rulers of Kaski, impressed by the trading skills of Newar communities, invited merchants from Bhaktapur to settle in the area between 1658 and 1669 A.D. These settlers were granted land via a royal decree bearing the "Mohar" seal, giving the area its name, Mohariya Tole.

== Notable Landmarks ==
- Bindhyabasini Temple: A significant religious site located at the northern edge of the neighbourhood.
- Hamro Sangam Park: A local community park providing green space for residents.
- Ganesh Temple: A traditional place of worship dedicated to Lord Ganesha, central to the local Newar community's daily worship.
- Buddha Temple: A significant temple dedicated to Lord Buddha reflecting the area's diverse religious heritage.
