= Bhimsen Tole =

Historic neighbourhood in Pokhara, Nepal

Bhimsen Tole Nepali: भिमसेन टोल
- Neighbourhood
- Interactive map of Bhimsen Tole
- Coordinates: 28°13′51.924″N 83°59′5.8884″E
- Country: Nepal
- Province: Gandaki Province
- District: Kaski District
- Municipality: Pokhara Metropolitan City
- Ward: Ward No. 2
- Settled: 18th century

Bhimsen Tole (Nepali: भिमसेन टोल) is a historic neighbourhood in the old bazaar of Pokhara, Nepal. Located within Ward No. 2 of the Pokhara Metropolitan City, it is one of the city's oldest commercial and residential areas, named after the prominent Bhimsen Temple situated at its center.

== Geography ==
Bhimsen Tole is situated in the northern part of old Pokhara, forming part of a continuous chain of historic Newar settlements. It is bordered by:

- Bhairab Tole to the north.
- Ganesh Tole to the south.
- Nadipur and Tersapatti to the east.
- Pokhara Baglung Highway to the west.

== History ==
The neighbourhood's history is tied to the migration of Newar merchants from Bhaktapur in the 18th century, following the unification of Nepal. These traders, known as the Chhabis Kuriya (twenty-six households), were invited to Pokhara to establish trade links between the Tibet and India routes.

Bhimsen Tole became a central commercial hub because Bhimsen is worshipped as the god of trade and commerce by the Newar community. Until the 1960s, it remained the primary marketplace for the entire Pokhara Valley before the city's commercial center shifted south toward New Road and Lakeside.

== Landmarks ==
- Bhimsen Temple: A 200-year-old pagoda-style temple dedicated to the Newar deity of trade. It is considered the oldest temple in Pokhara and is famous for its intricate woodcarvings on the doors and windows.
- Old Bazaar: The street itself retains traditional architecture with brick houses and carved wooden balconies, reflecting the Newari style of the Kathmandu Valley.
