= Kundahar =

Kundahar कुँडहर
- Location within Gandaki Province Location within Gandaki Province
- Coordinates: 28.2020736°N 84.0142915°E
- Country: Nepal
- Province: Gandaki Province
- District: Kaski District
- Time zone: UTC+5:45 (Nepal Time)
- Postal Code: 33700
- Area code: 061

Kundahar (Nepali: कुँडहर) is the residential area of Pokhara, Nepal. Kundahar covers ward no 12,13,14 of the Pokhara Metropolitan City.

== Education ==
There are several government and private institution in Kundahar.

Public/Private Schools and Colleges:

- Kundahar Primary School
- Shree Amarsingh Model Higher Secondary School
- Kaski Modernized Academy
- Baseline Academy School.
- Balvidhya Mandir Secondary Boarding School
- Pokhara United Academy

== Religious Places ==
=== Bhadrakali Temple ===
Bhadrakali Temple (Nepali :भद्रकाली मन्दिर) is a temple on the East of Pokhara in Kundahar area, atop a small hill and is dedicated to Goddess Kali. Founded in the year 1817 BS, the temple shrines Hindu goddess of power and strength, Bhadrakali or Durga and covers an area of 135 ropanies. There are two ways to reach atop. The eastern way has 292 steps uphill to climb to reach the temple while another way from southern part 265 steps.

=== Matepani Gumba ===
Matepani Gumba located in Kundahar area of Pokhara, Kaski District of the Gandaki Zone in western Nepal. It was established in 1960 A.D.by Nyeshang people who migrated to Pokhara from Manang. Situated on a small hill, east of the Pokhara city, the monastery is about five km from Mahendra pul. This gumba is situated on the top of a green hill mountain.

=== Masjid Aqsa ===
Masjid Aqsa is a place of worship for Muslims. It is located at Miyapatan.

== Economy ==
Banks in the area include Muktinath Bikash Bank, Laxmi Bank, Kundahar Sahakari, and Prabhu Bank.

There are several industries inside Pokhara Industrial Estate.

== Communication ==
List of several Internet Service Providers(ISP) in Kundahar are:

- Worldlink
- Nepal Telecom
- Vianet
- Classic Tech

== Transportation ==
Linked With Prithivi Highway. Kundahar is served by local public buses from Miyapatan to Bagar, Khaukhola to Mahendrapul, Chauthe to Bagar. Local taxis are also available.

== Hotels and lodges ==
- Royal Palm Resort

== Gallery ==
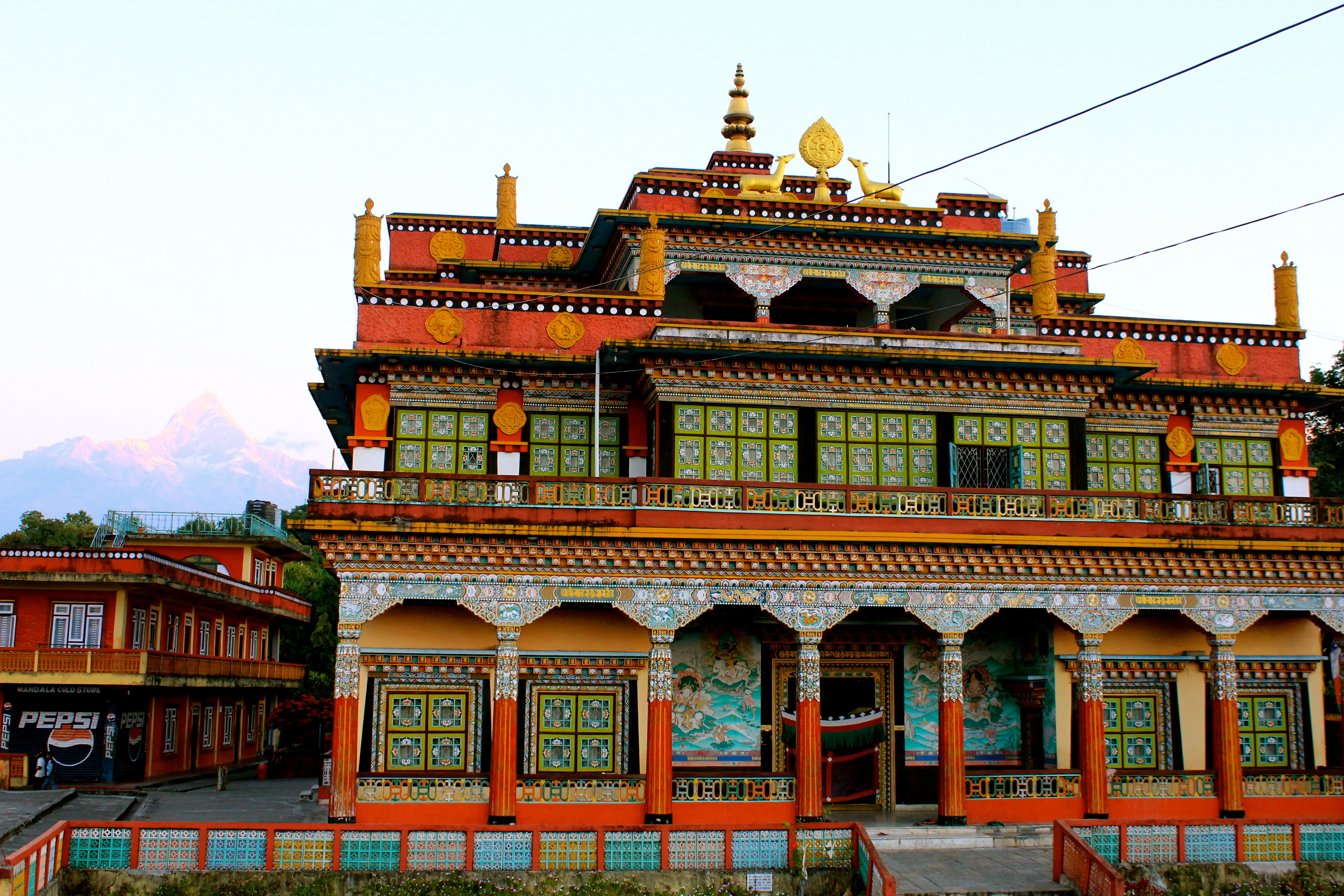

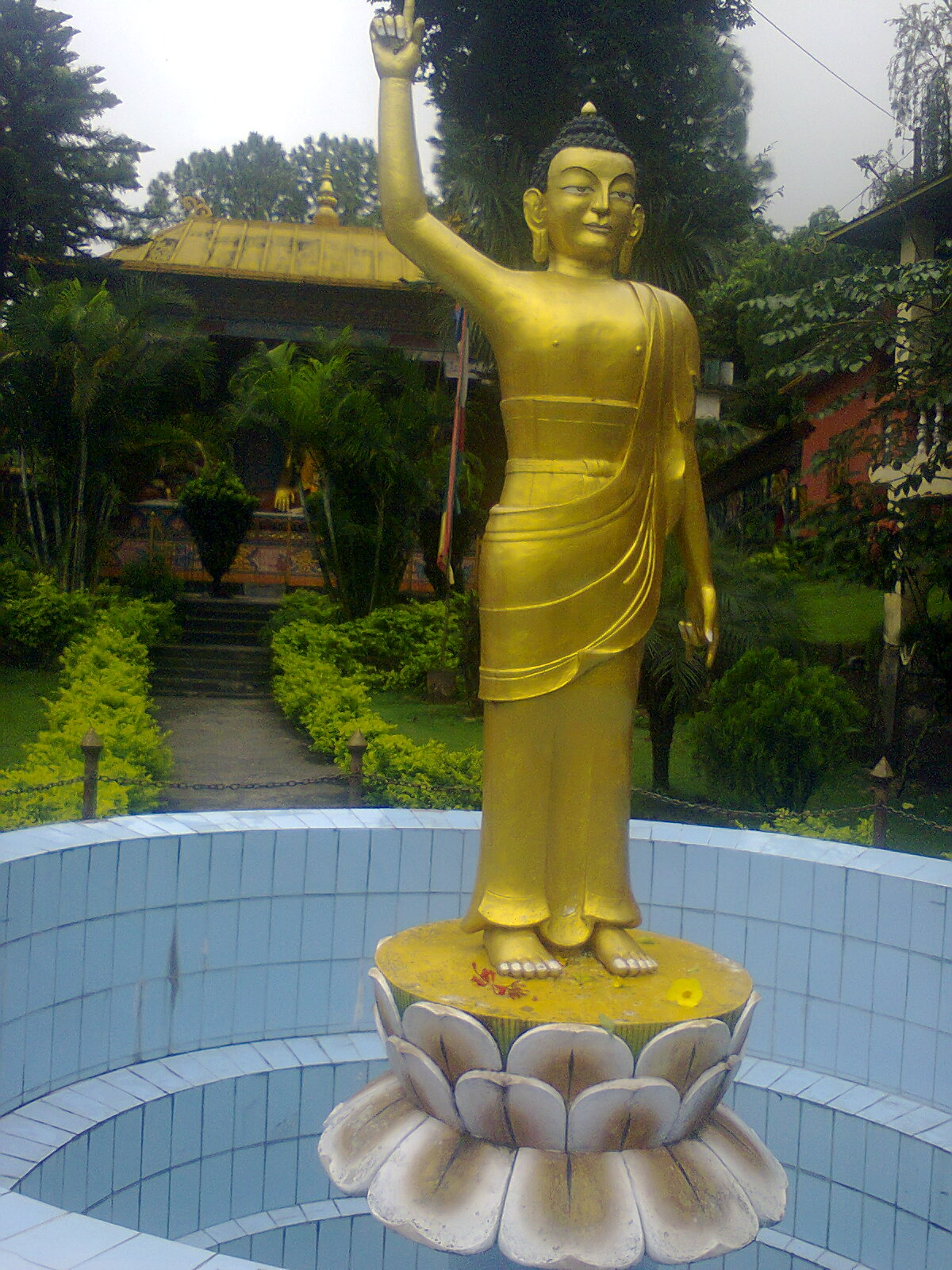

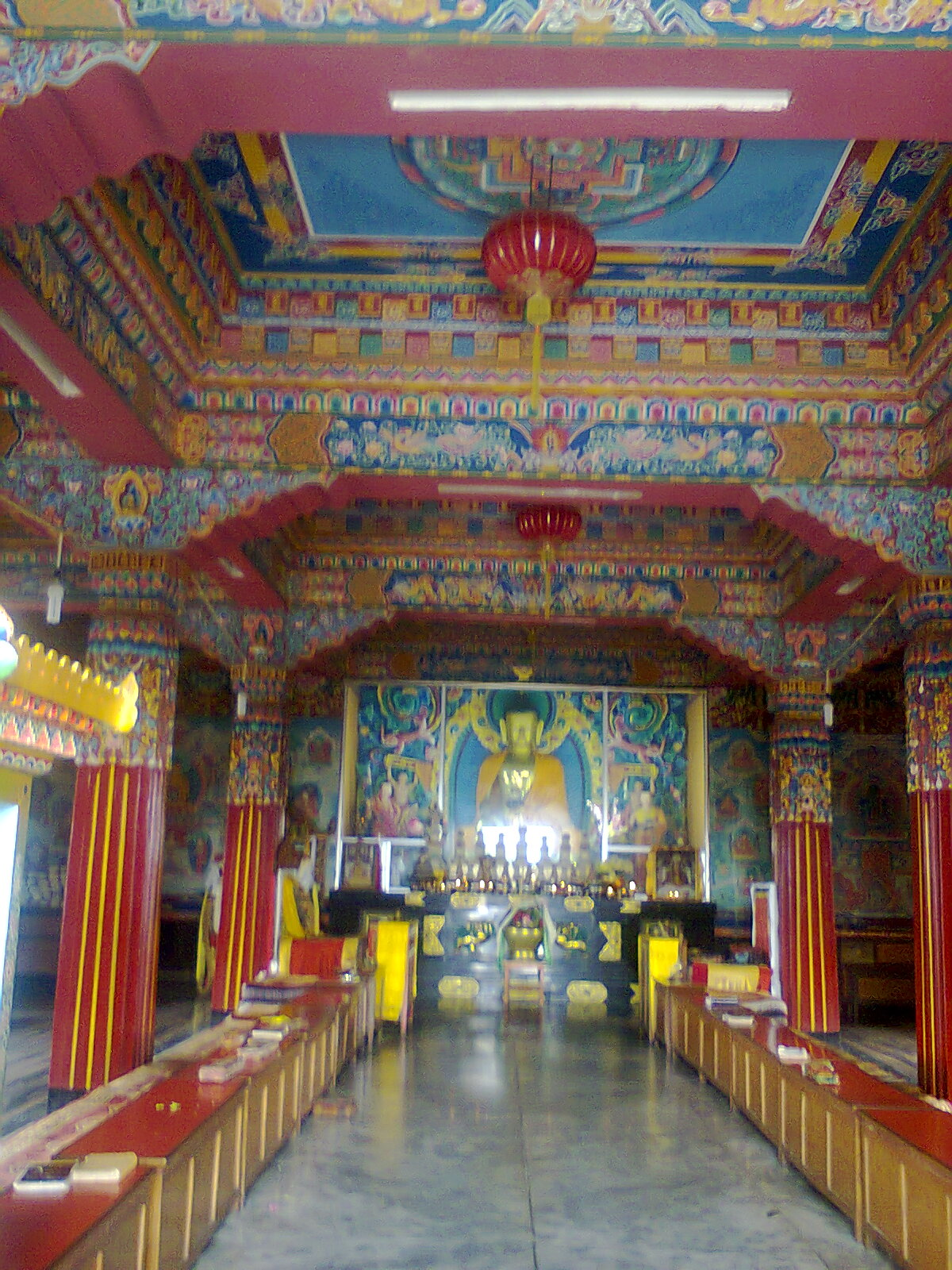

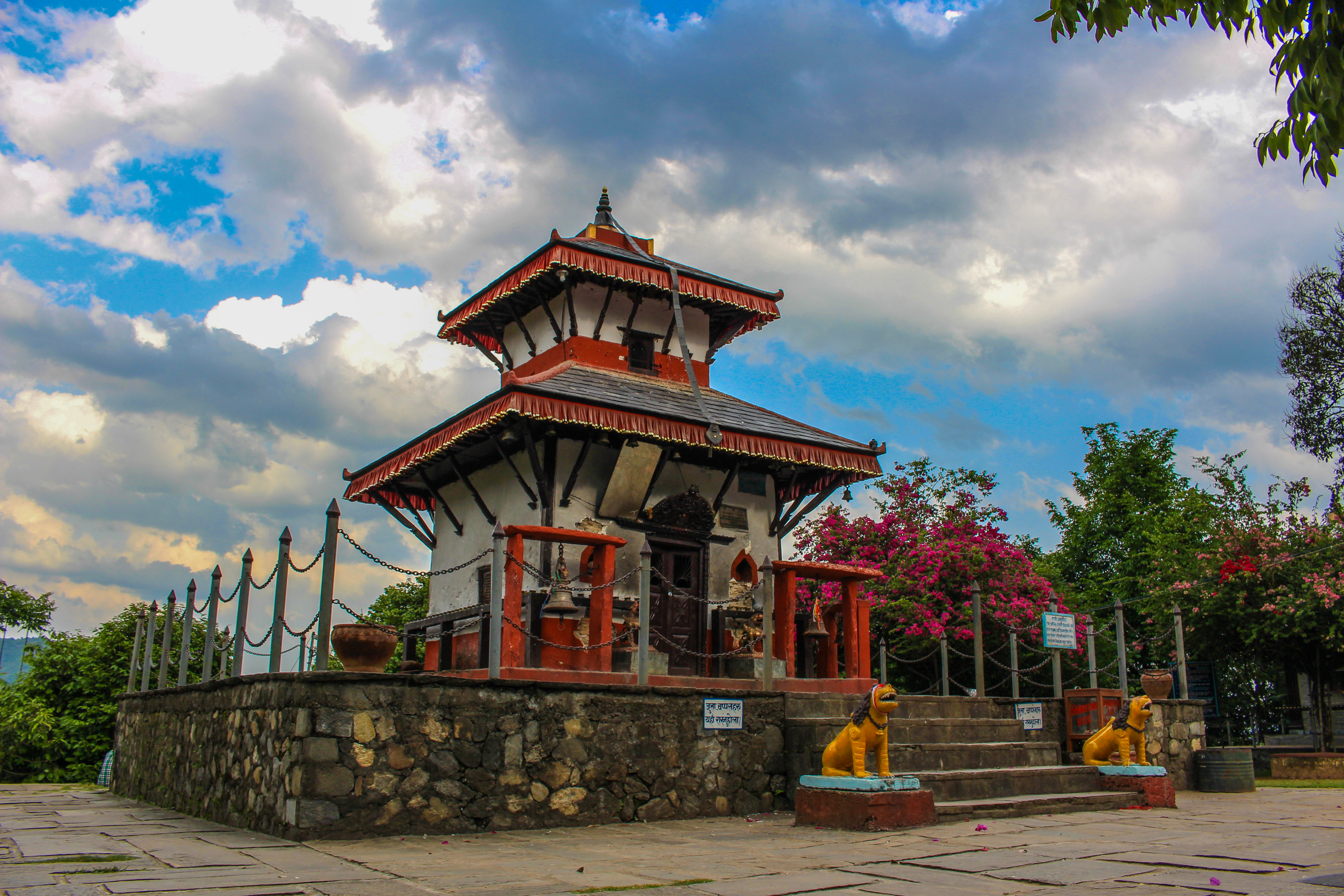

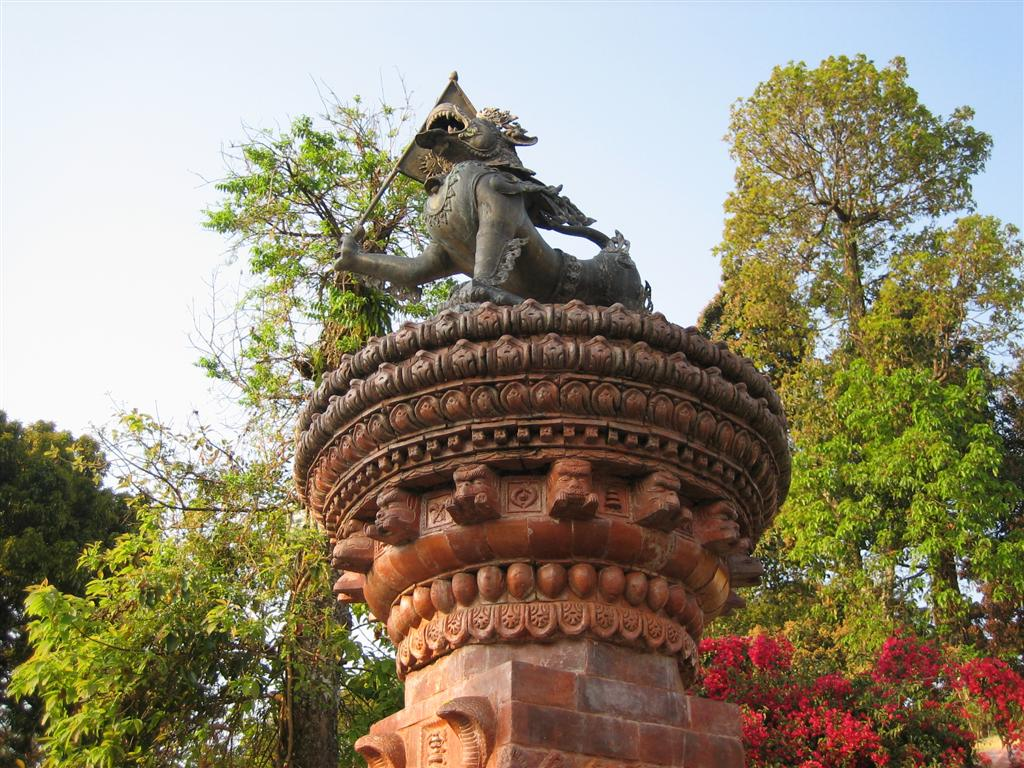

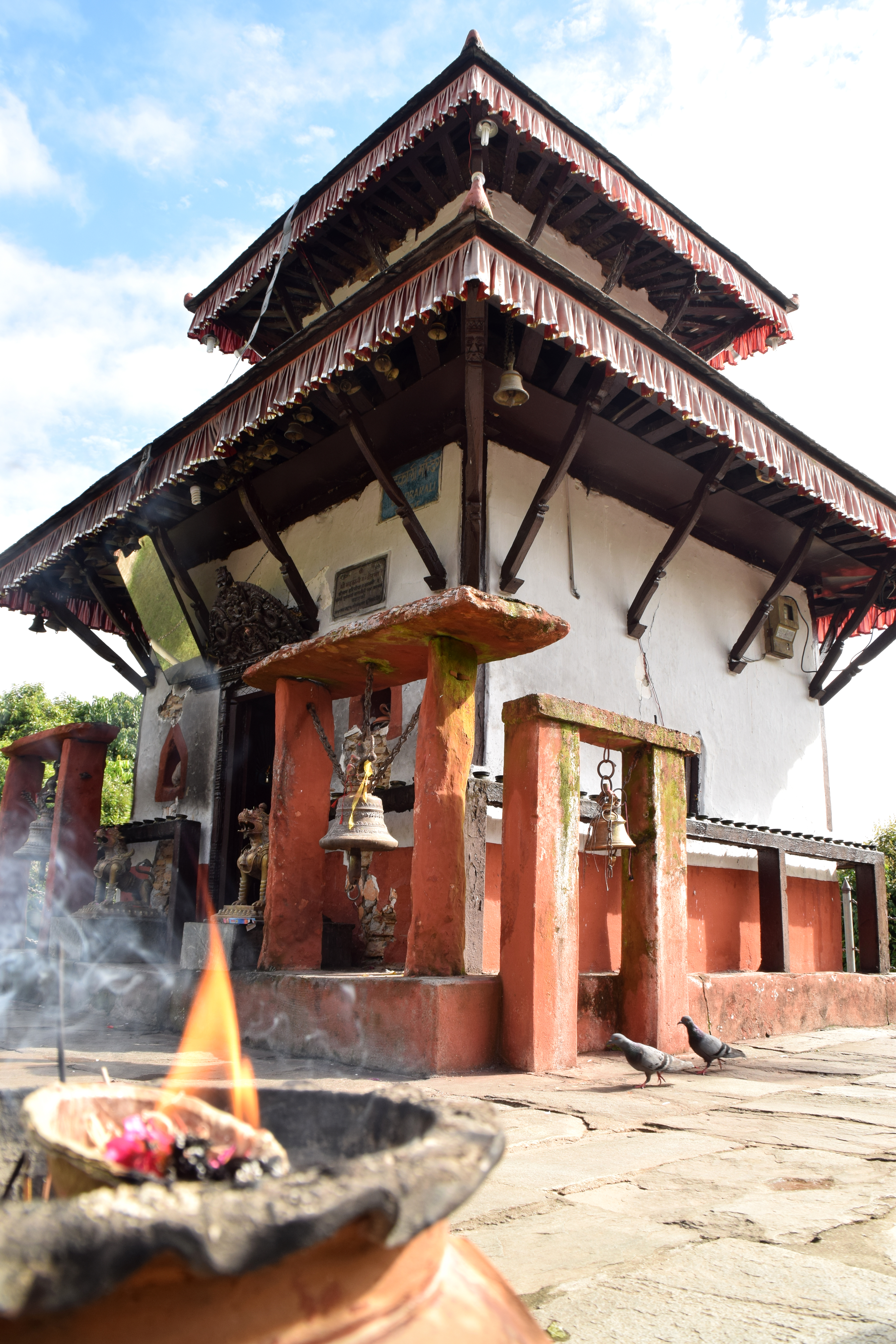
