= Bhairab Tole =

Historic neighbourhood in Pokhara, Nepal

Bhairab Tole Nepali: भैरव टोल
- Neighbourhood
- Interactive map of Bhairab Tole
- Coordinates: 28°14′01″N 83°59′09″E
- Country: Nepal
- Province: Gandaki Province
- District: Kaski District
- Municipality: Pokhara Metropolitan City
- Ward: Ward No. 2 and Ward No. 3

Bhairab Tole (also spelled Bhairav Tole; Nepali: भैरव टोल) is a historic neighbourhood in Pokhara, Nepal. It is situated in the city's ancient urban core of the Pokhara Metropolitan City. It is recognized as one of the earliest settlement areas in the Pokhara Valley and served as a major commercial hub prior to 1960.

== Location ==
Bhairab Tole is located in the northern part of old Pokhara. It is bordered by:

- Mohariya Tole to the north (Ward 2).
- Bhimsen Tole to the south (Ward 2).
- Nadipur to the east (Ward 3).
- Pokhara Baglung Highway to the west (Ward 2).

== History ==
The development of Bhairab Tole as a market center began when twenty-six Newar households, known locally as Chhabis Kuriya, migrated from Bhaktapur over 200 years ago. These settlers were skilled artisans who established the neighborhood around the temples they built for worship.

The community established guthis (trusts) to maintain the local temples and engaged in the trade of textiles, sweets, and other essential goods. This migration followed the unification of Nepal by Prithvi Narayan Shah, transforming the area into a vital node for trade between the mountains and the plains.

== Notable Landmarks ==
- Bhairab Temple: A significant cultural landmark and one of the oldest temples in Pokhara. It is the namesake of the neighbourhood and is famous for the Bhairab Naach (dance) performed periodically.
