= Naya Bazar, Pokhara =

Naya Bazar नयाँ बजार
- Print Patra
- Location in Nepal Naya Bazar (Nepal)
- Coordinates: 28.216949°N 83.989633°E
- Country: Nepal
- Province: Gandaki
- City: Pokhara
- Time zone: +5:45 (Nepali Time)

Nayabazar (Nepali: नयाँ बजार) is the name of Ward Number 9 in Pokhara Metropolitan City in Nepal. It refers to a two lane street from Mahendrapul to Prithivi Chowk.

== Boundaries of Nayabazar ==
East: Ranipauwa
West: New Road
North: Mahendrapul
South: Prithivi Chowk
