= Bhadrakali Temple =

Hindu temple in Nepal

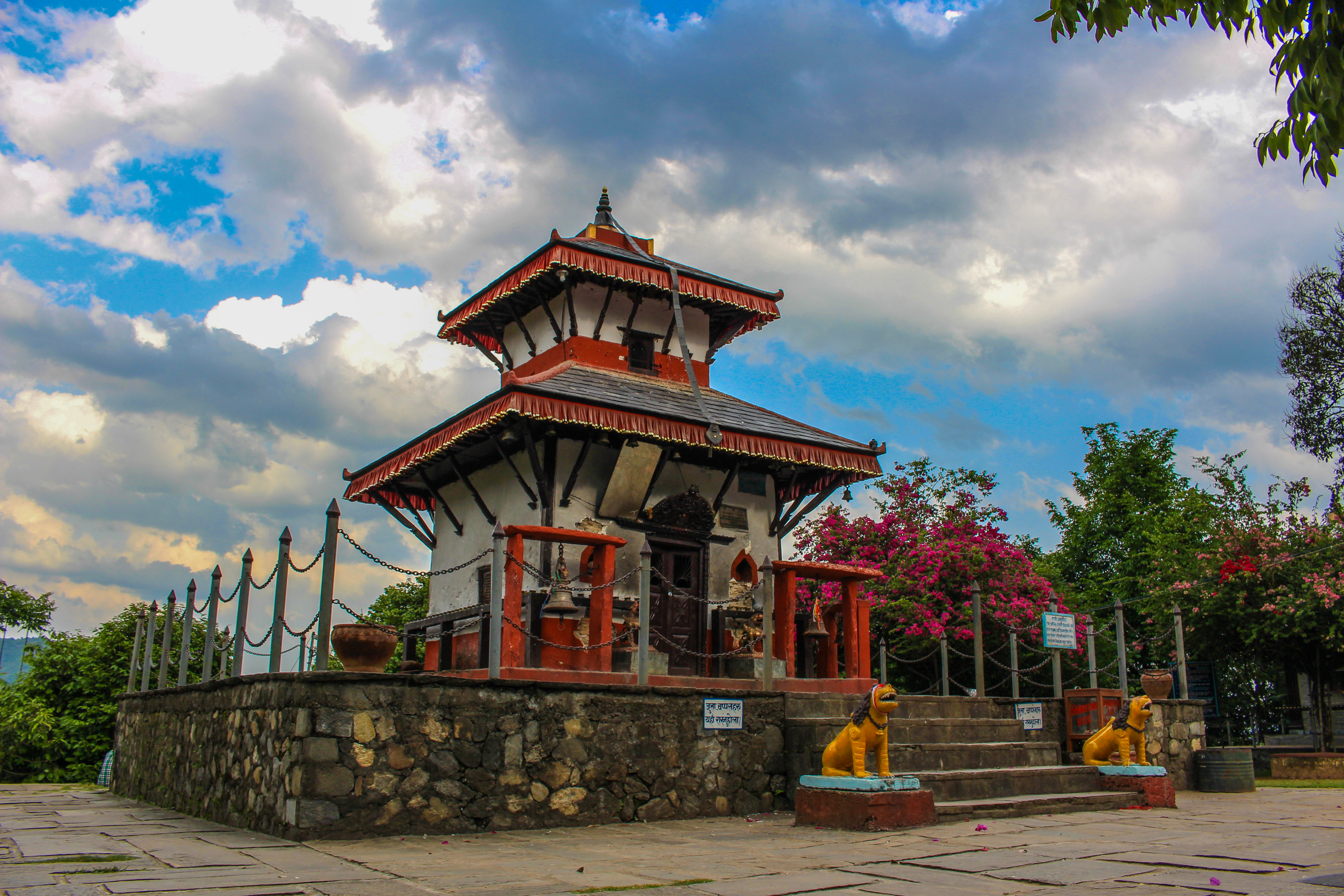

- Location in Nepal province-gandaki province(4)

Religion
- Affiliation: Hinduism
- District: Kaski
- Deity: Goddess Bhadrakali
- Festival: Dashain

Location
- Country: Nepal
- Interactive map of Bhadrakali Temple

Architecture
- Type: Pagoda

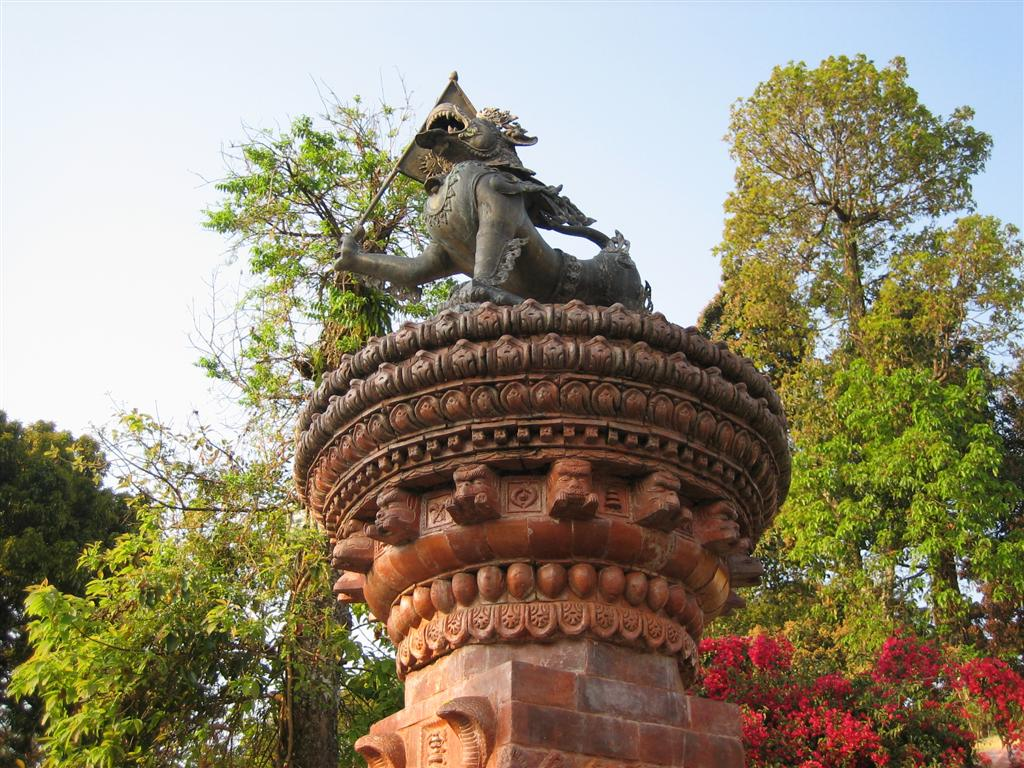
Lion Guard at Bhadrakali Temple, Kundahar, Pokhara

Bhadrakali Temple (Nepali :भद्रकाली मन्दिर) is a temple on the East of Pokhara in Kundahar, atop a small hill. It is dedicated to the Goddess Kali. Founded in the year 1817, the temple shrines the Hindu goddess of power and strength. Bhadrakali or Durga covers an area of 135 ropanies. There are two ways to reach atop: the eastern way has 292 steps to reach the temple while traversing from the southern part is only 265 steps. In the year 1817, the temple was previously known as “Mudule Thumpko." Currently, the temple stands at 2930 feet above sea level, and it is surrounded by greenery, which give it a "peaceful environment."

This temple came about when the Goddess "Bhadrakali" told the Priest to dig into the hill; there they found the statue of the Goddess. Since then, it has been worshipped as “BhadraKali."

== Festivals ==
There are many festivals throughout the year, and thousands of people attend these grand celebrations. The most important festivals of them all is called Dashain, which usually takes place during either September or October (as per the traditional Hindu Calendar).

== Transportation ==
Local public buses to Bhadrakali Temple are available from Mahendrapul and Khaukhola. Local taxis are also available.

== Gallery ==
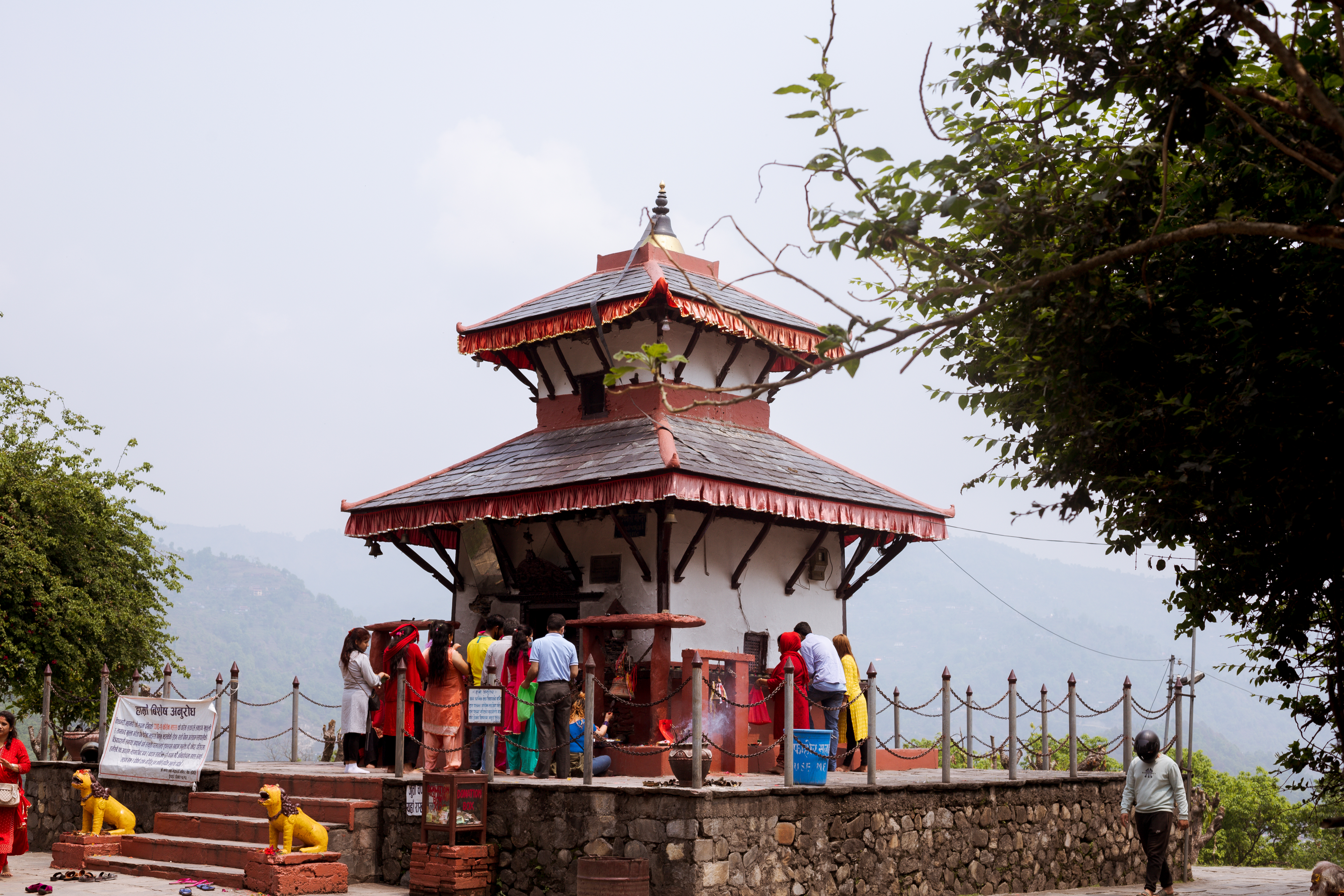

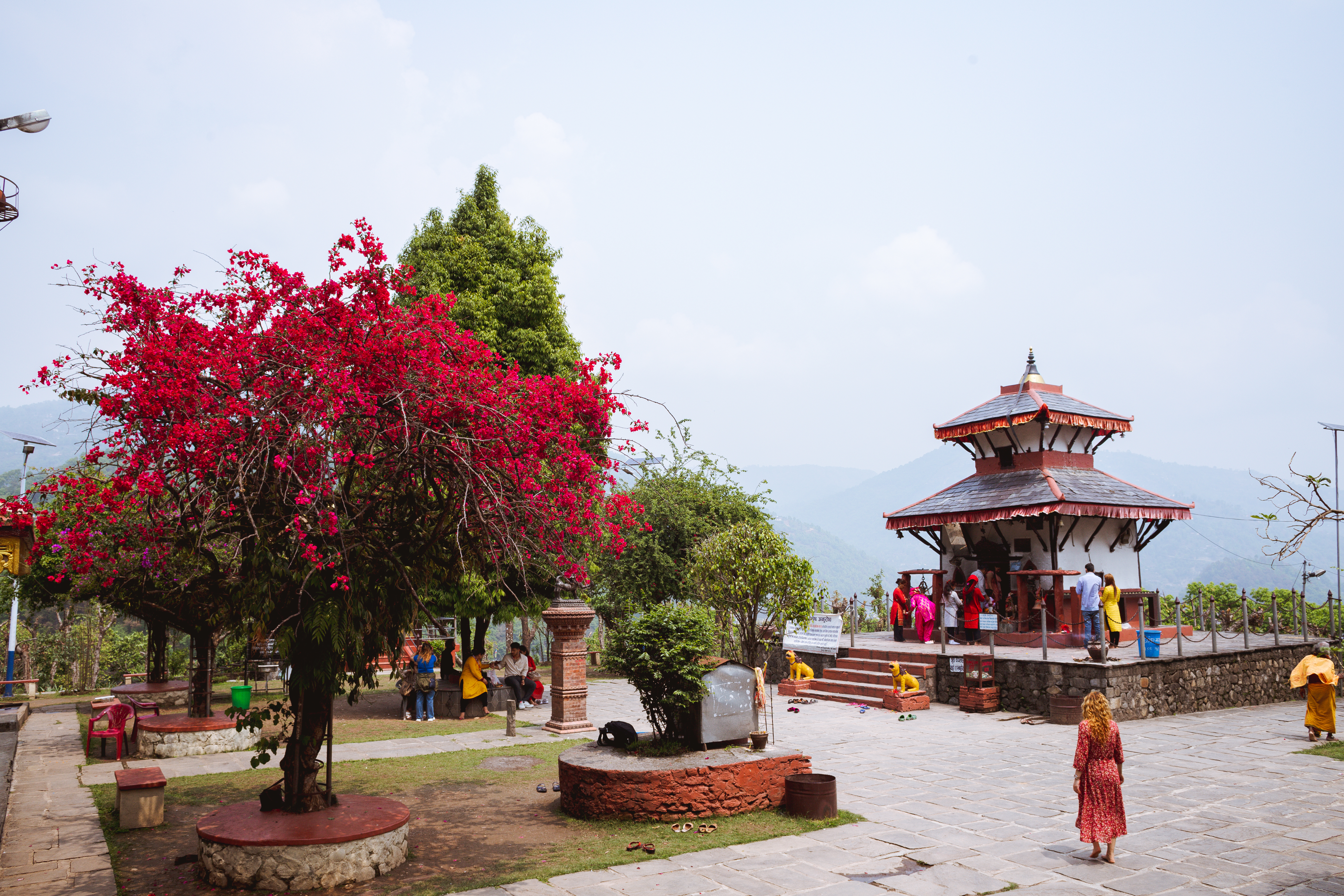

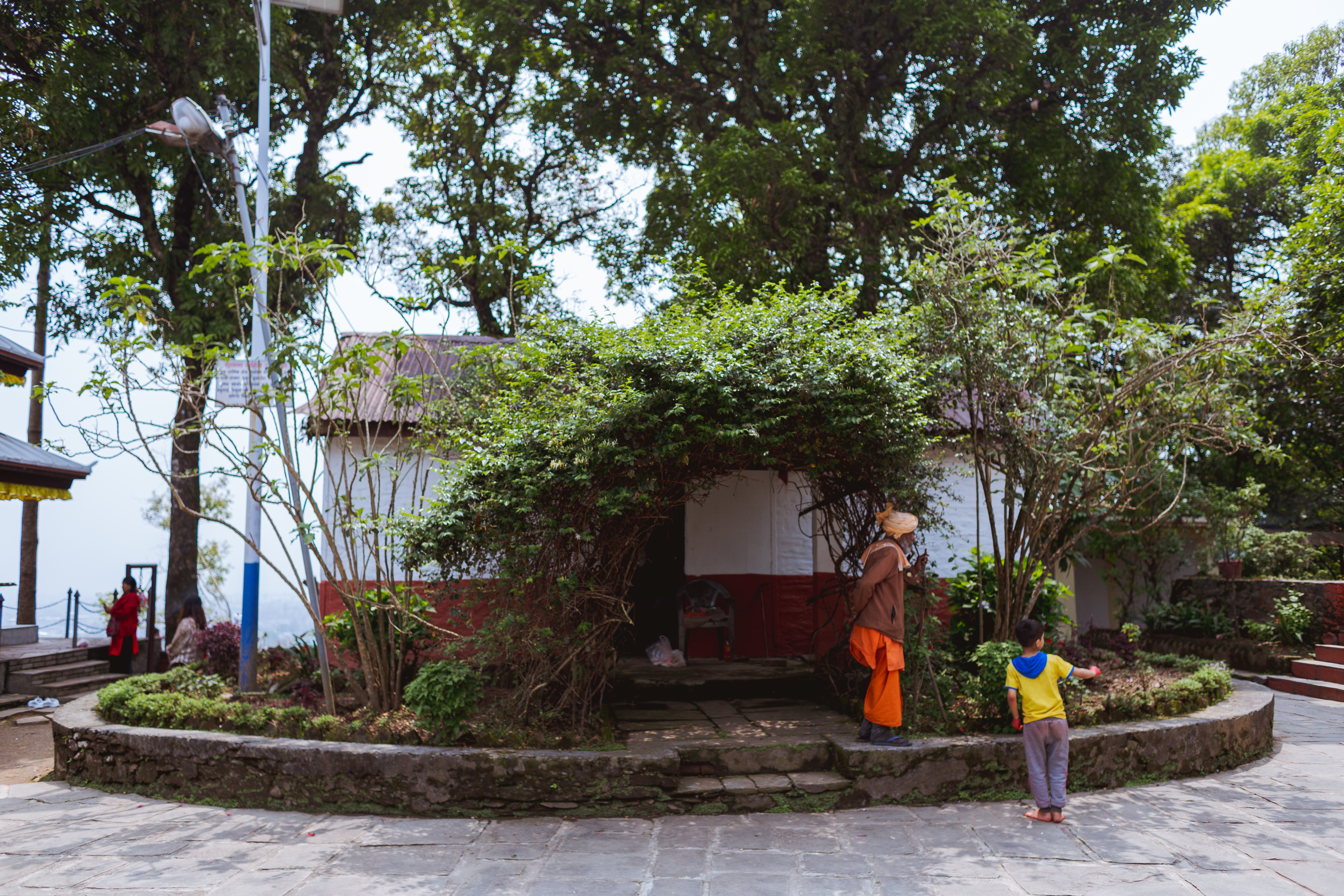

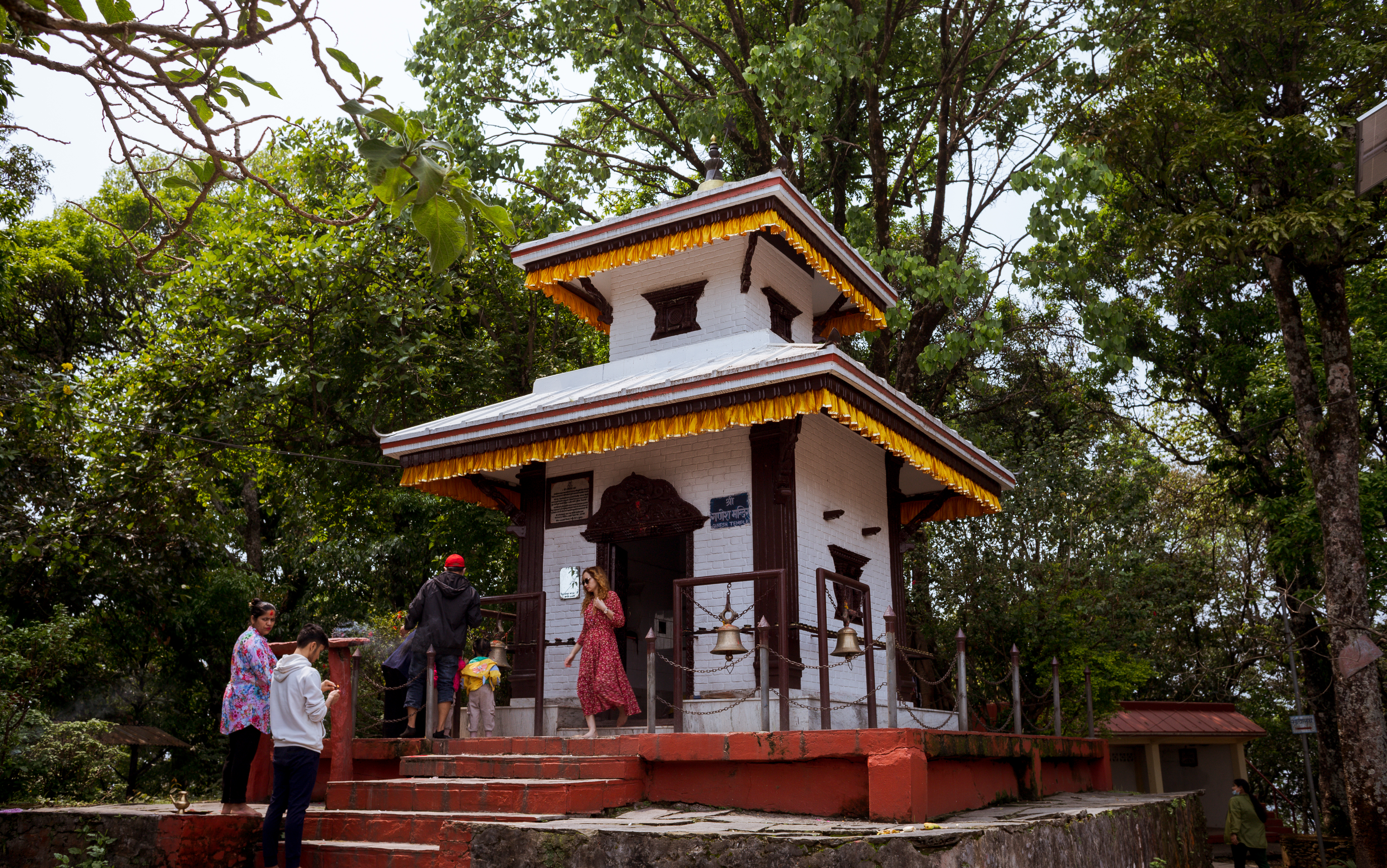

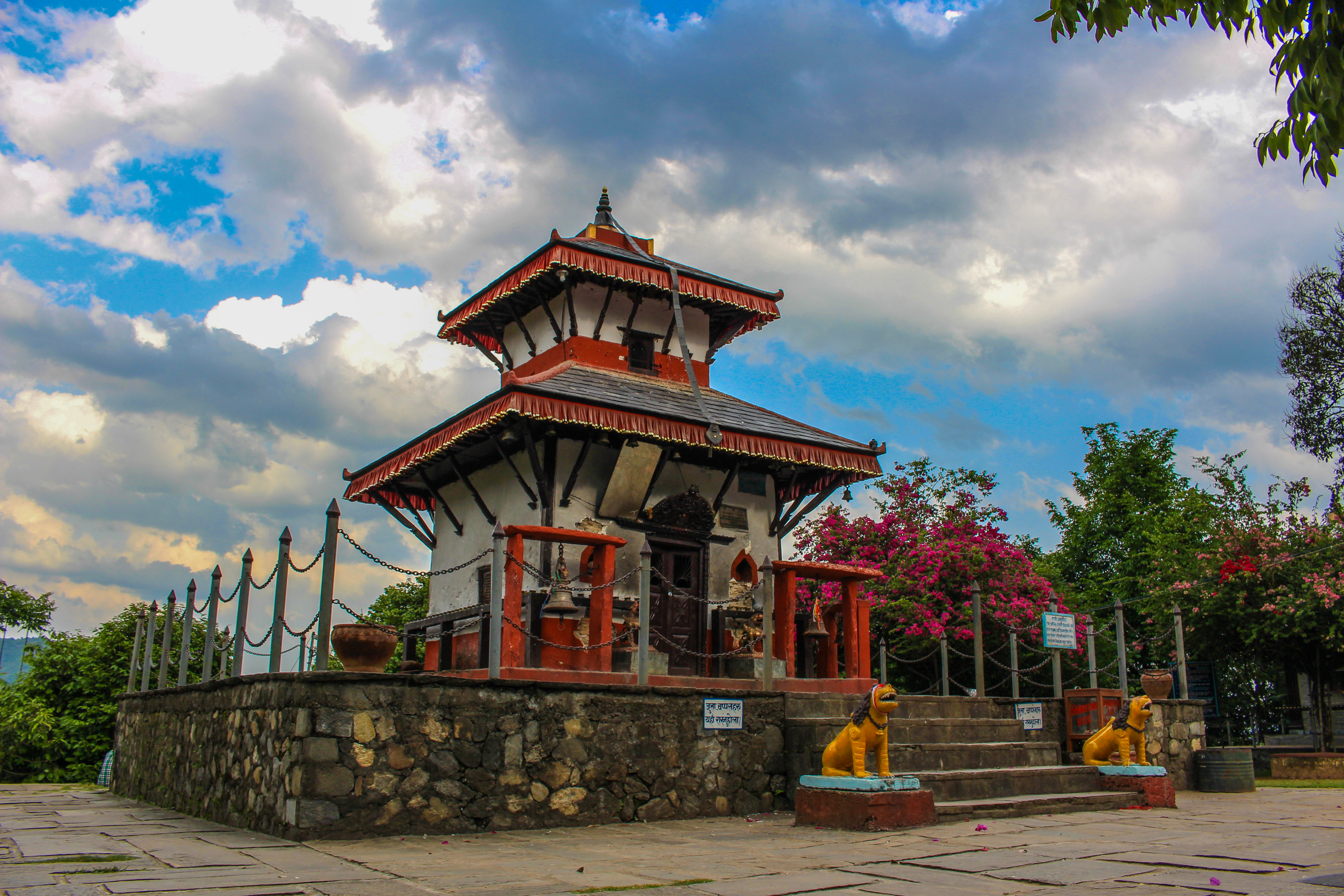

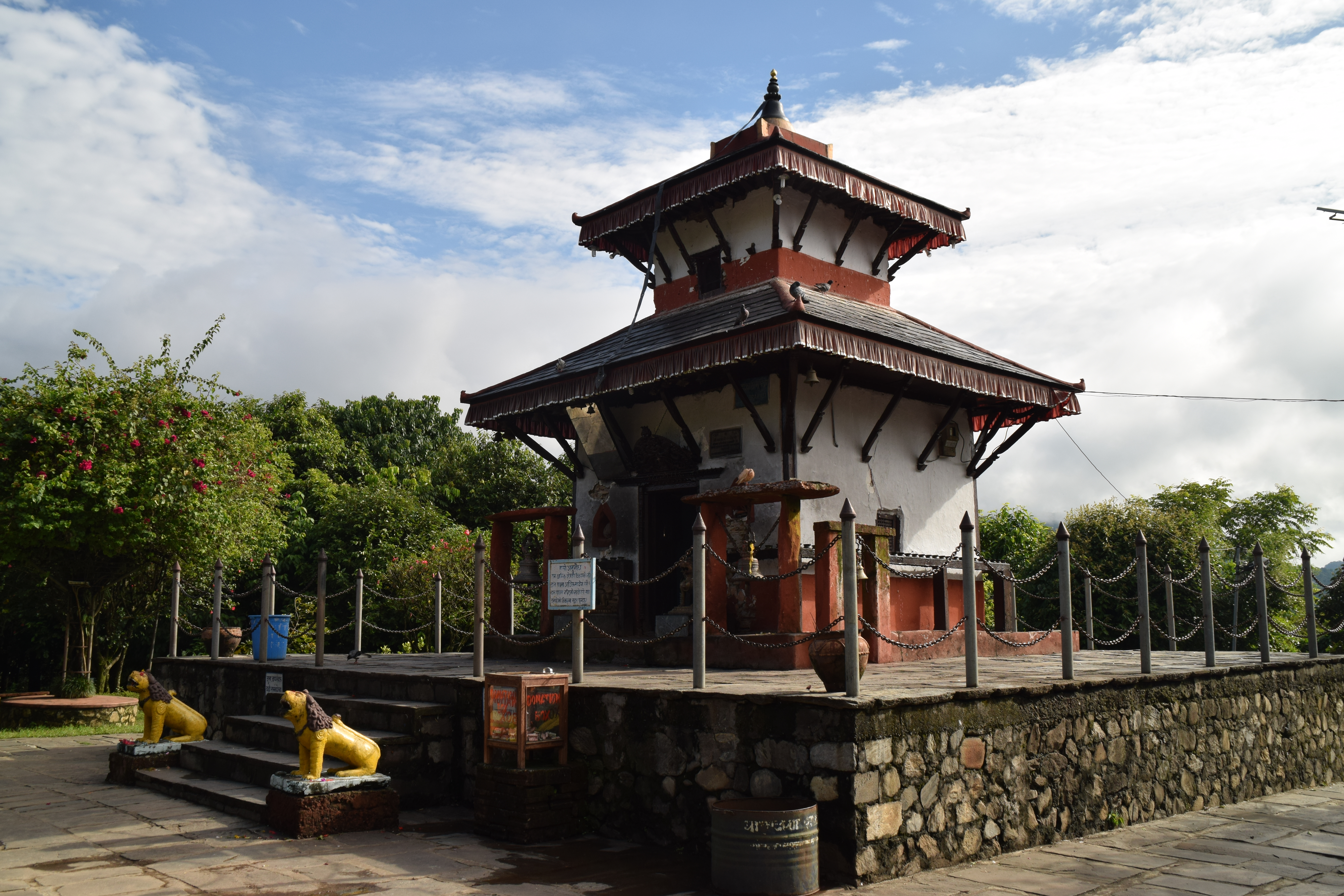

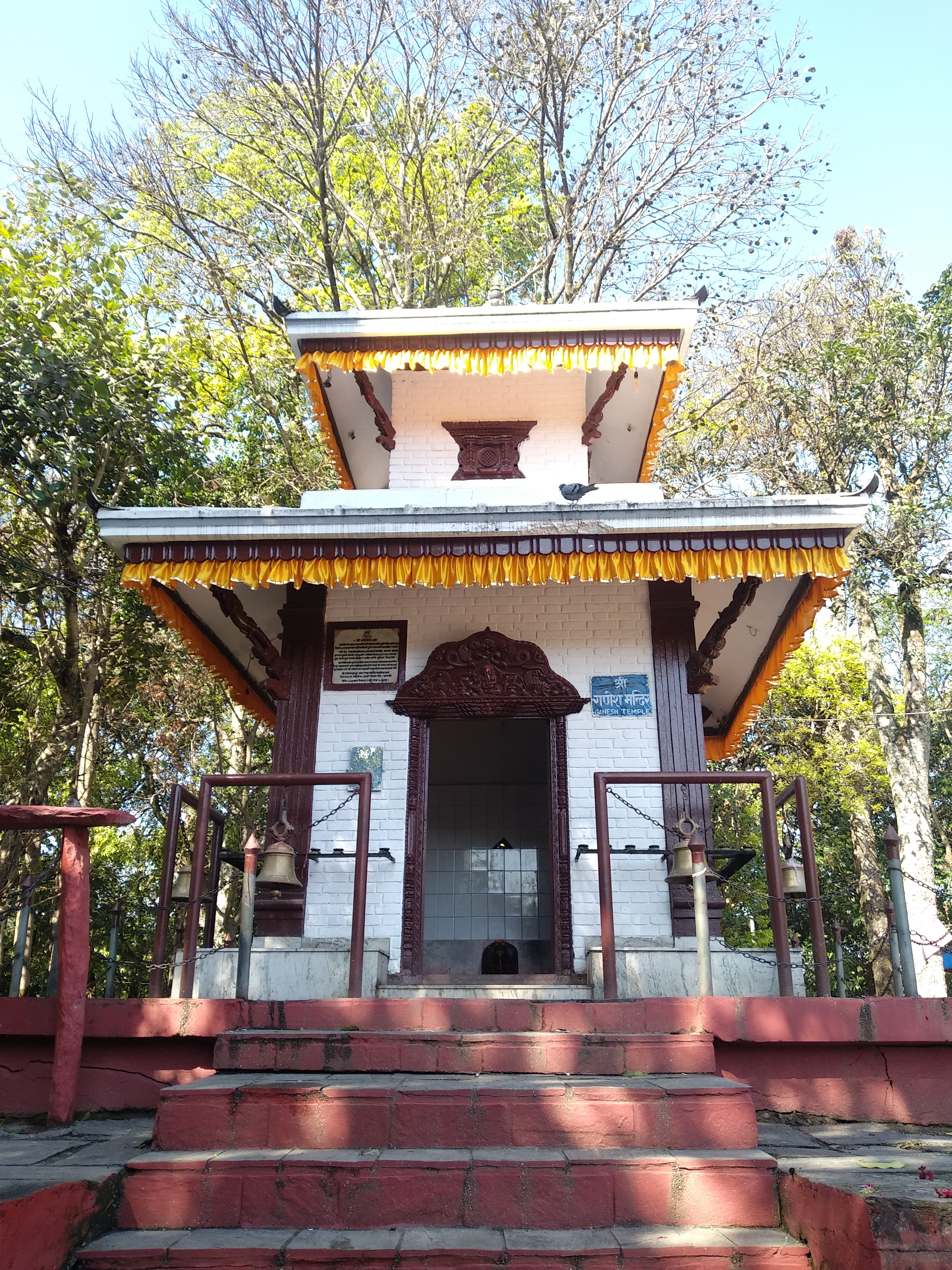
Ganesh Temple

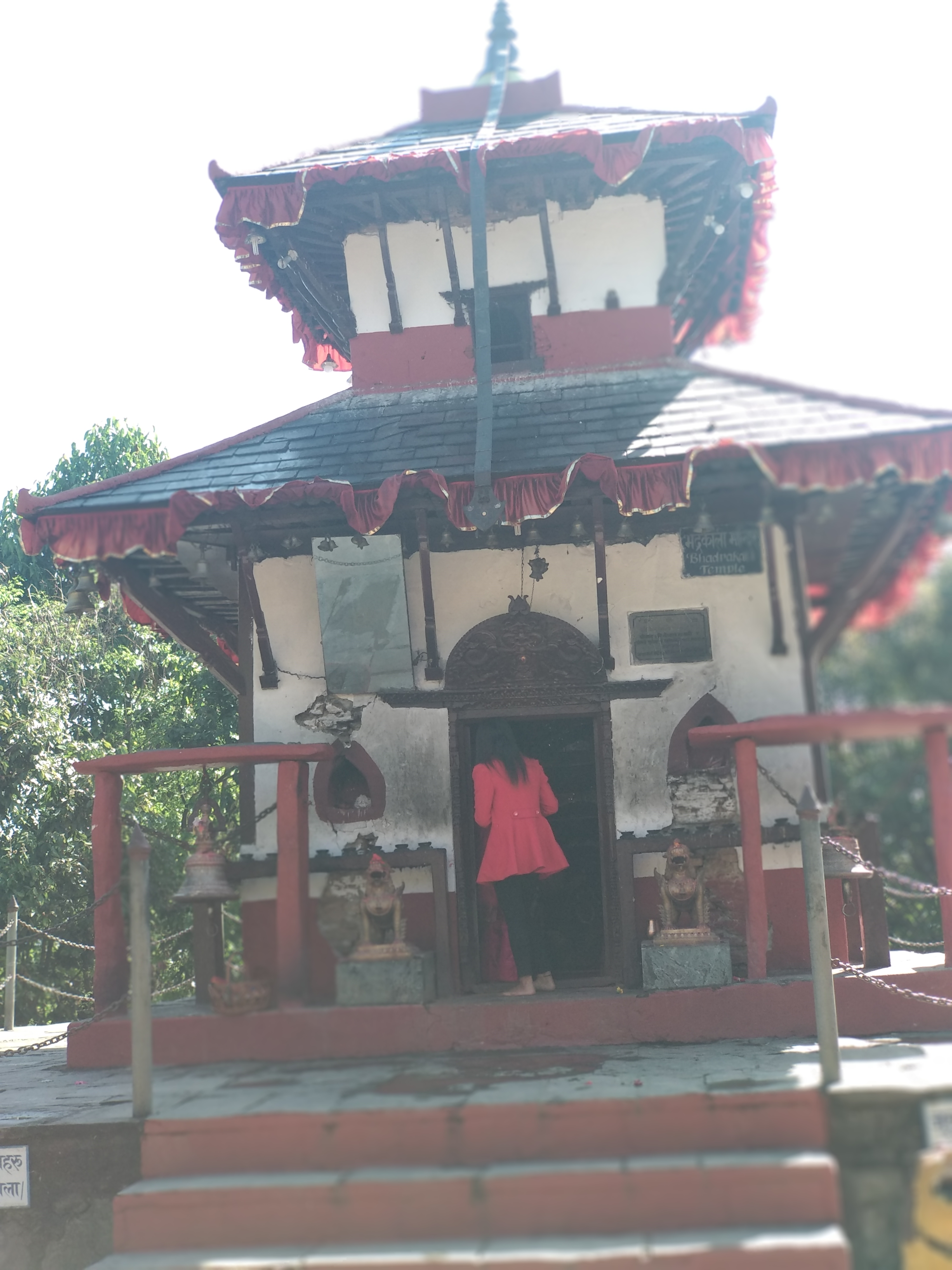

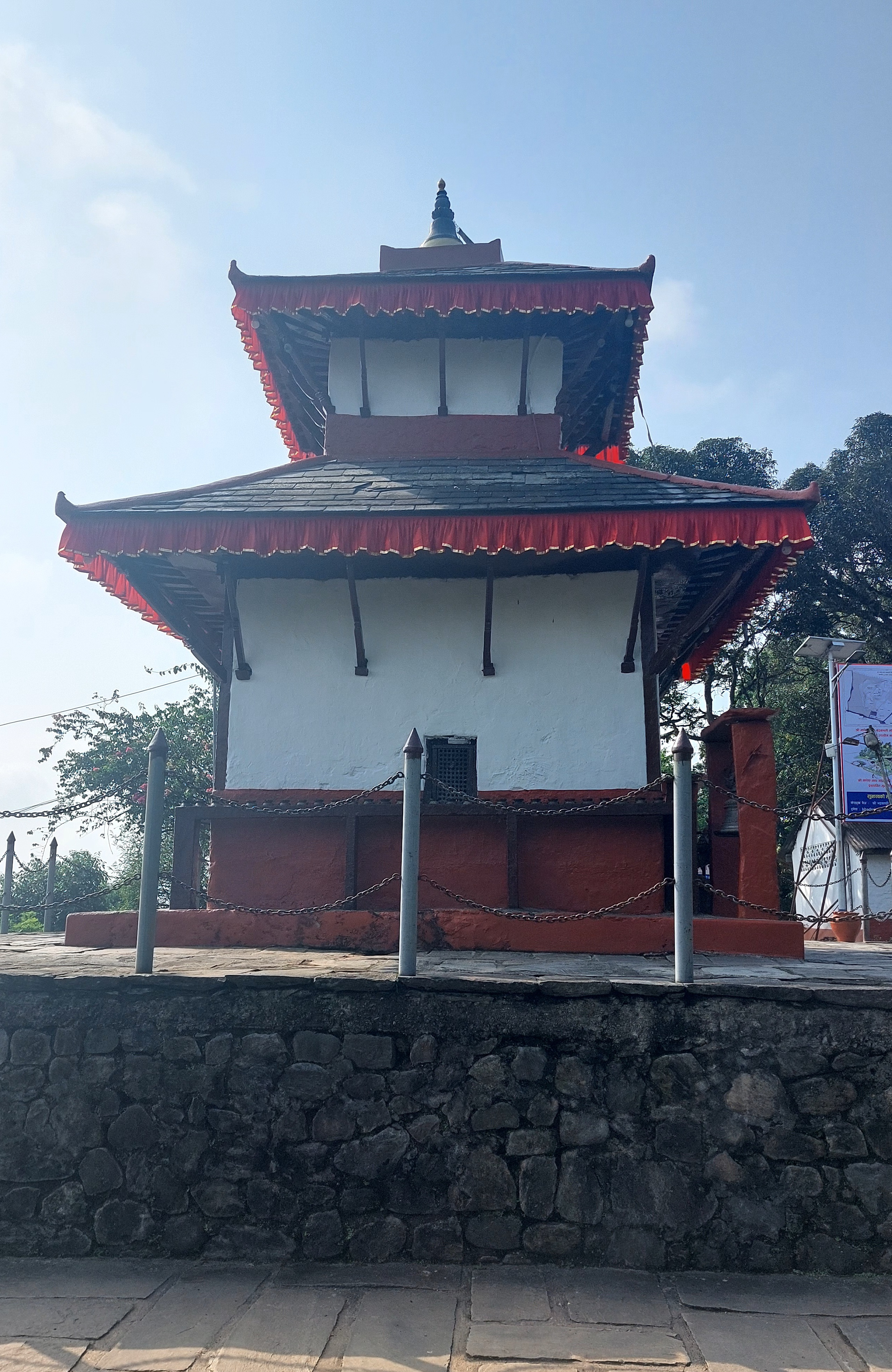
Bhadrakali temple Back side

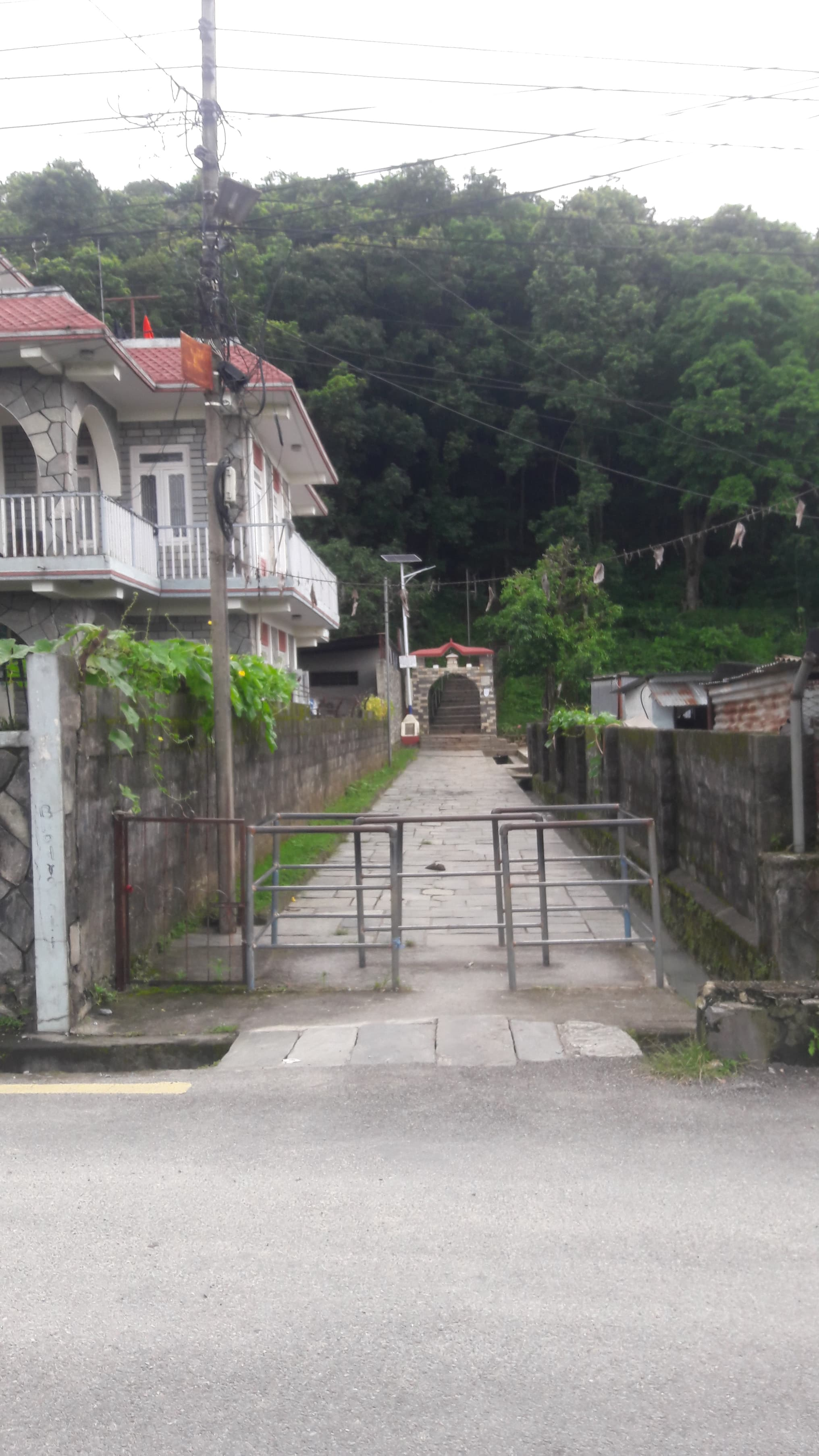
Bhadrakali temple front entrance.
