= Matepani Gumba =

Monastery in Matepani, Nepal

- Matepani Gumba
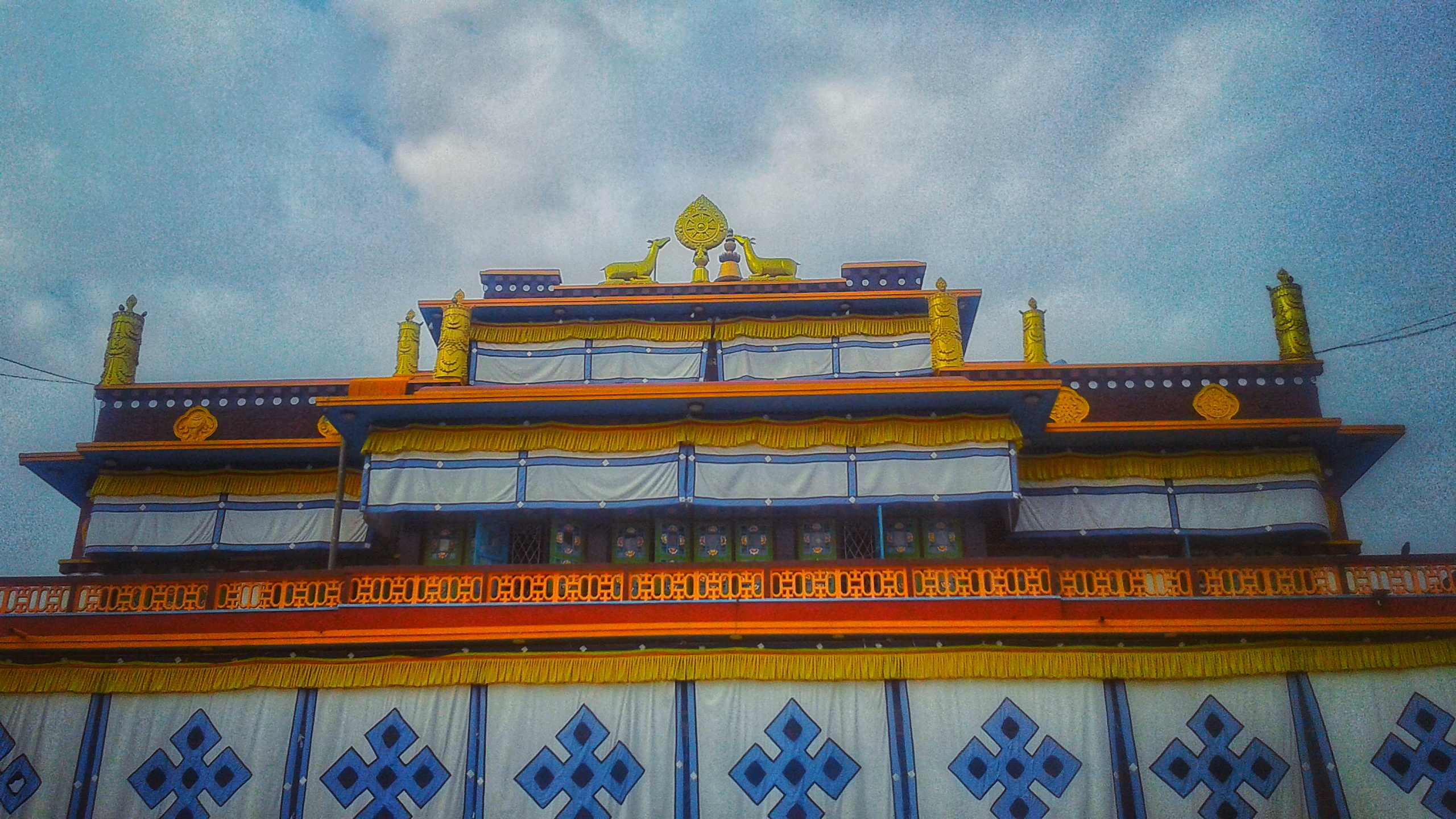

Religion
- Affiliation: Buddhists
- District: Kaski
- Province: Gandaki
- Deity: Buddha
- Festivals: Losar, Buddha Jayanti

Location
- Location: Matepani, Pokhara
- Municipality: Pokhara Metropolitan City

Architecture
- Completed: 1960 A.D

Matepani Gumba located in Matepani, Kundahar area of Pokhara, Kaski District of the Gandaki Zone in western Nepal. It was established in 1960 A.D.by Nyeshang people who migrated to Pokhara from Manang. Situated on a small hill, east of the Pokhara city, the monastery is about five km from Mahendrapul. This gumba is situated on the top of a green hill mountain.

== Monks praying ==
Several times a day one of the Buddhist monks will grab a gong and announce the time for prayer with a bang. Like ants out of the woodwork, all of the students and teachers of the monastery come clambering out of their dormitories and offices to enter the grand hall of the gumba.

Typically these prayers are held in the morning and late afternoon. But if there is some special event or holiday, the monks may be cooped up in the temple for the entire day reciting prayers and mantras. Depending on how strict the temple is or how many friends you made with the resident monks, you may even be invited to sit in on one of the prayers.

== Grand Hall ==
The interior of the Matepani Gumba is decorated with bright elaborate murals depicting stories from Buddha’s life and myths related to the various deities which make up the religion.

== Transportation ==
Local public buses are available from Mahendrapul and Kahukhola.

Local taxis are also available.

== Gallery ==
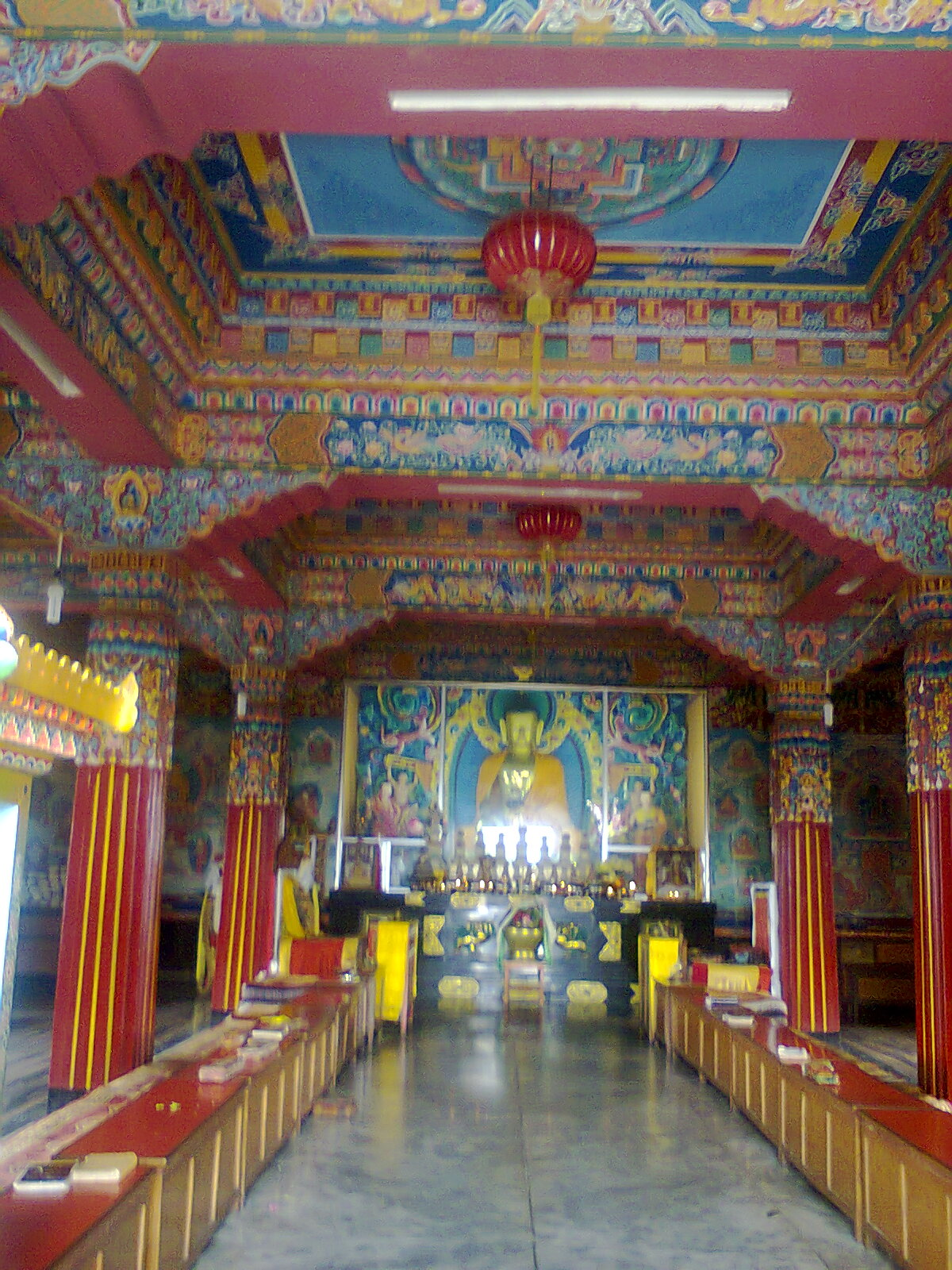

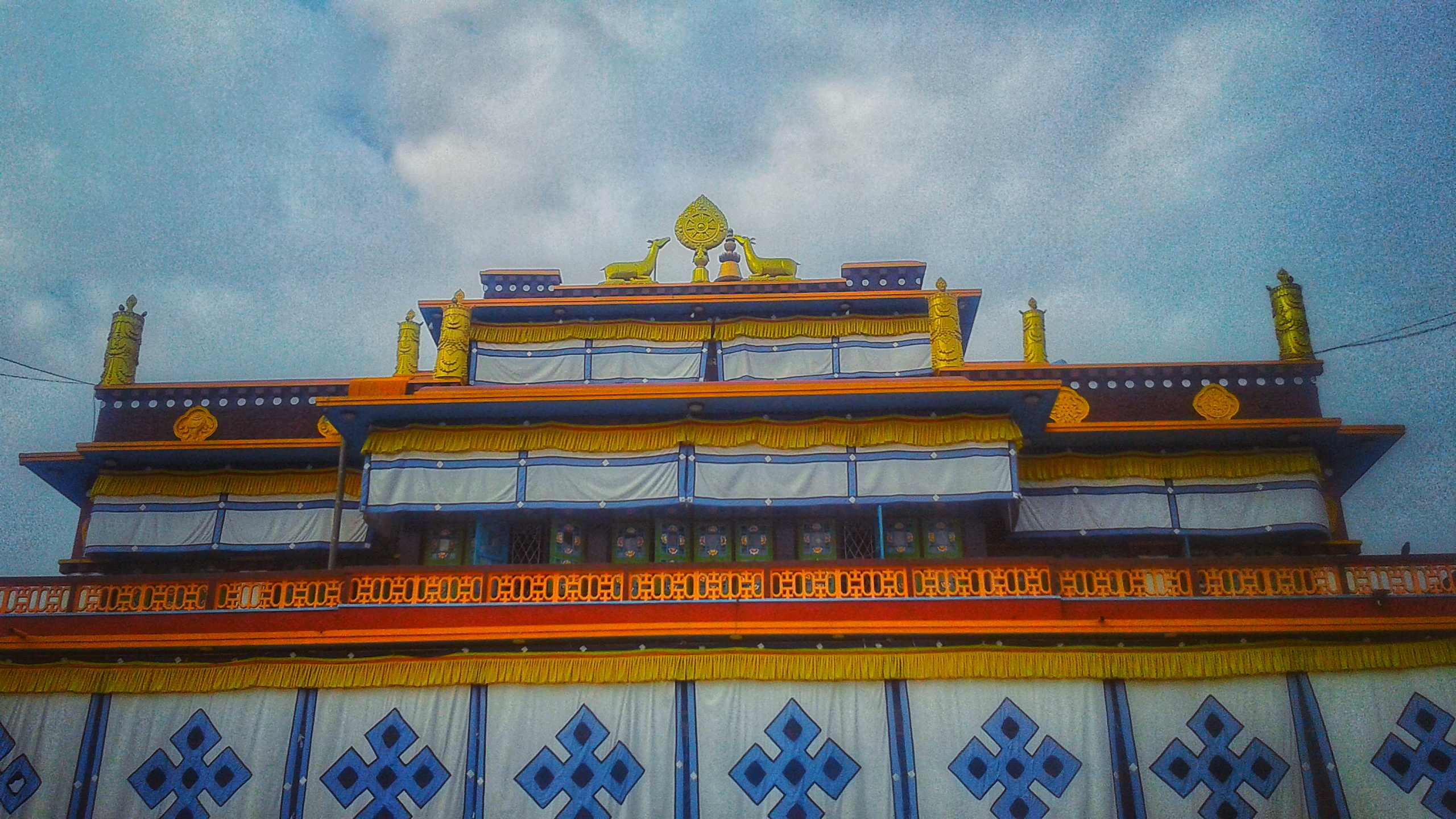

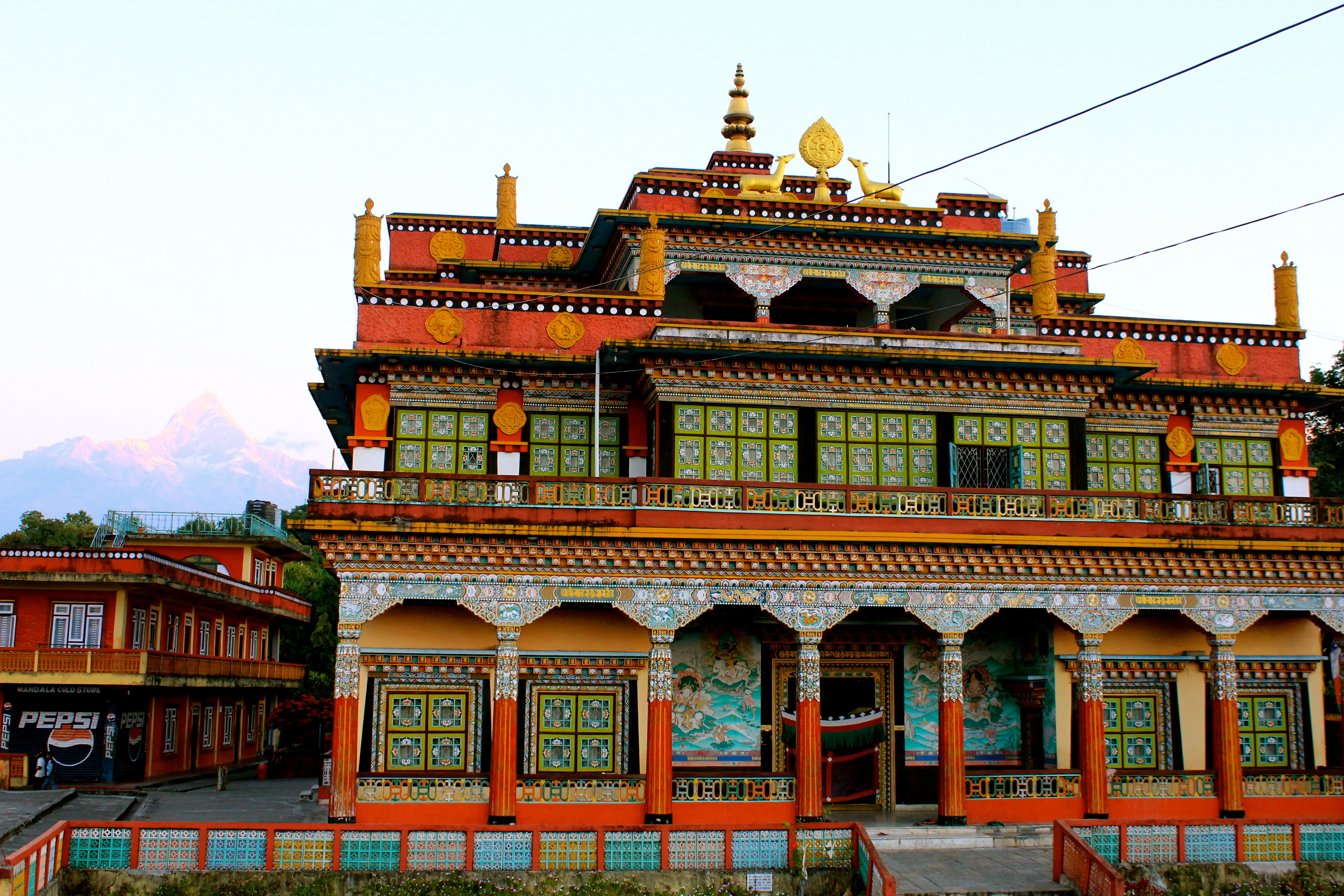
