= Kali Khola =

River tributary in Nepal

Coordinates: 28°14′28″N 83°59′41″E

The Kali Khola (Nepali: काली खोला) is a tributary of the Seti Gandaki River in Nepal. It joins the Seti Gandaki in the ward of Bagar in Pokhara in central Nepal.
