= Seti Hydropower Station =

- Location within Nepal
- Country: Nepal
- Location: Kaski District
- Coordinates: 28°13′50″N 83°57′54″E
- Purpose: Power and irrigation
- Status: Operational
- Owner: Nepal Electricity Authority

Dam and spillways
- Type of dam: run-of-river

Power Station
- Commission date: 1985
- Installed capacity: 1.5 MW

Commissioned in 1985 AD at Nadipur in Pokhara, Nepal, Seti Hydropower Station has an installed capacity of 1.5 MW. Water from the Seti Gandaki River is dammed to provide electricity which is later used for irrigation.

== Seti Hydropower Project ==
Seti Hydropower Station is a run of river type with installed capacity of 1.5 MW and design generation of 9.8 GWh consisting of 3 units each 0.5 MW. It is located at Nadipur, Pokhara and was commissioned in 1985 AD with assistance from Government of People’s Republic of China and Government of Nepal. The power canal for this power station is jointly used for irrigation purposes looked after by Department of Irrigation and hence, the operation of this power station is affected by irrigation as well. The cumulative generation of Seti HPS has reached 254.77 GWh till 2011/12 from its first run. The station has generated 11.62 GWh in FY 2010/11 and 10.41 GWh in FY 2011/12 with decrease of 10.37%. The station contributed 0.25% of the total energy in the INPS in 2011/12.

== See also ==
- List of power stations in Nepal
