= Nalamukh =

Coordinates: 28°13′N 83°59′E

A Trijunction in Pokhara (Tersapatti, Mahendrapul and Bagar), Nepal, that has some very old houses in the city with spectacular architecture. Nalamukh among the first residential areas and commercial centers in Pokhara before 1960. Bhimsen Temple is located in Nalamukh.
