= Seti Gandaki River =

River in Nepal

Coordinates: 27.8211°N 84.4546°E

Seti Gandaki
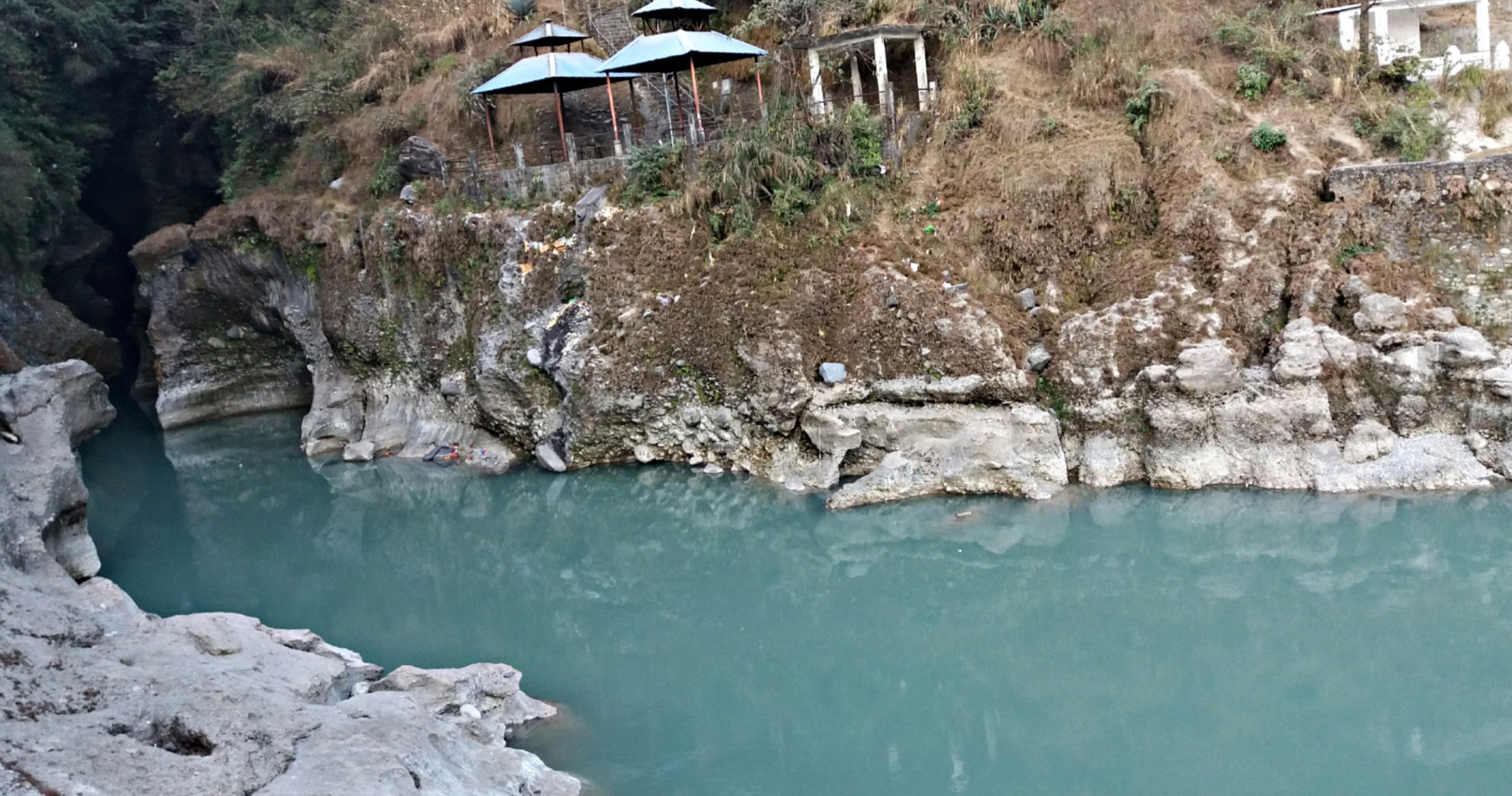
- Seti Gandaki from Ramghat Pokhara

Physical characteristics
- Source
  - location: Slopes of Annapurna
- Mouth
  - location: Trishuli River

Basin features
- River system: Narayani River

The Seti Gandaki River, also known as the Seti River or the Milk River, is a river of western Nepal, a left tributary of the Trishuli River. It gorges around Pokhara and is a major attraction for tourists worldwide.

== Geography ==
The Seti rises from the base of the Annapurna massif, and flows south and south-east past Pokhara and Damauli to join the Trishuli River near Devghat.

The lakes of Pokhara were created through a geological process. As the Seti carried the moraine from Annapurna Himalayas after the burst of glacial lakes at various pre-historical time periods, the moraine were deposited on the routes of the rivers. This caused formation of natural lakes.

== Cultural and religious significance ==
The Seti is one of the holiest rivers of Nepal, worshiped in Hinduism as a form of Vishnu. The river is also famous because of its proximity to some holy places and is the central point of many stories of Hindu mythology, such as the Mahabharata, one of the longest books of Hinduism, written by Vyasa, who was born near the confluence of the Gandaki and Madi rivers near Damauli, Tanahun, Nepal.

== Tributaries ==
Major tributaries of Seti Gandaki River are Mardi Khola, Kali khola, Phedi khola, Bijayapur khola, Kotre khola, Pudi khola, Suraudi khola, Bange khola and the largest tributary Madi. Pokhara, Leknath, Suklagandaki, Bhimad and Damauli are the cities through which Seti river flows.

== Exploration ==
The Seti Gandaki was successfully descended for the first time in June 1971 by Daniel C. Taylor and Jennifer Ide. They went by raft, having to portage around the three kilometer section where the whole Seti river goes underground.

== May 2012 flood ==
A slurry of sediment, rock, and water suddenly surged through Pokhara Valley on May 5, 2012, obliterating dozens of homes and sweeping 72 people to their death.

== Dams ==
On 18 August 2022, the investment board of Nepal signed a memorandum of understanding with India's National hydroelectric power corporation (NHPC) Limited to develop the West Seti and Seti river projects. These projects are a total of 1200 MW.

== 2023 plane crash ==
On 15 January 2023, Yeti Airlines Flight 691 crashed on the Seti bank during approach to Pokhara International Airport, killing all 72 people on board.

== Bridges ==
- KI Singh Pul
- Mahendrapul
- Manipal Suspension Bridge
- Naraynathan Bridge
- Seti Nadi Pul - span 180m
- Dhunge Sanghu (natural bridge)

== Gallery ==
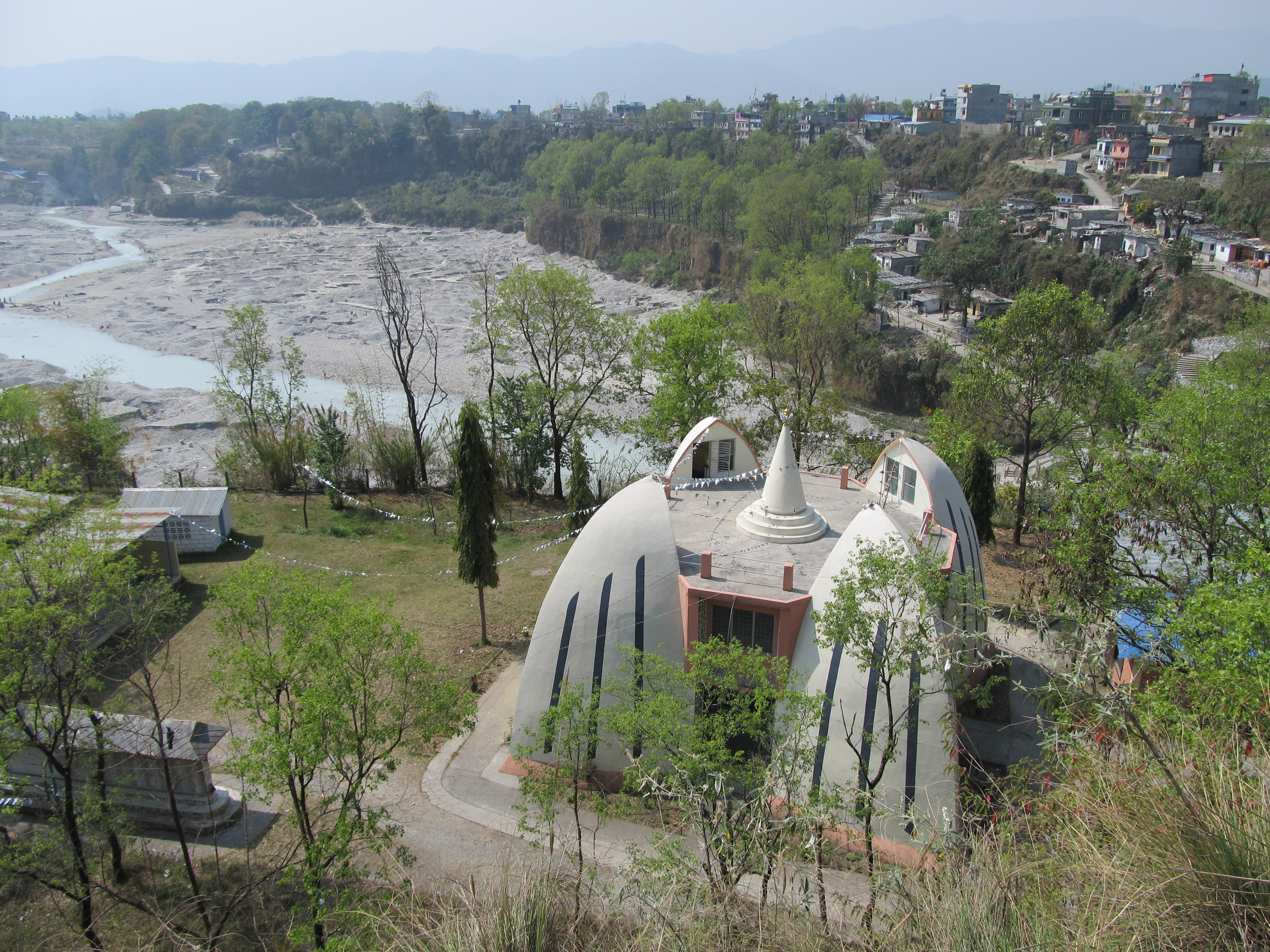
Gurung Museum, Pokhara

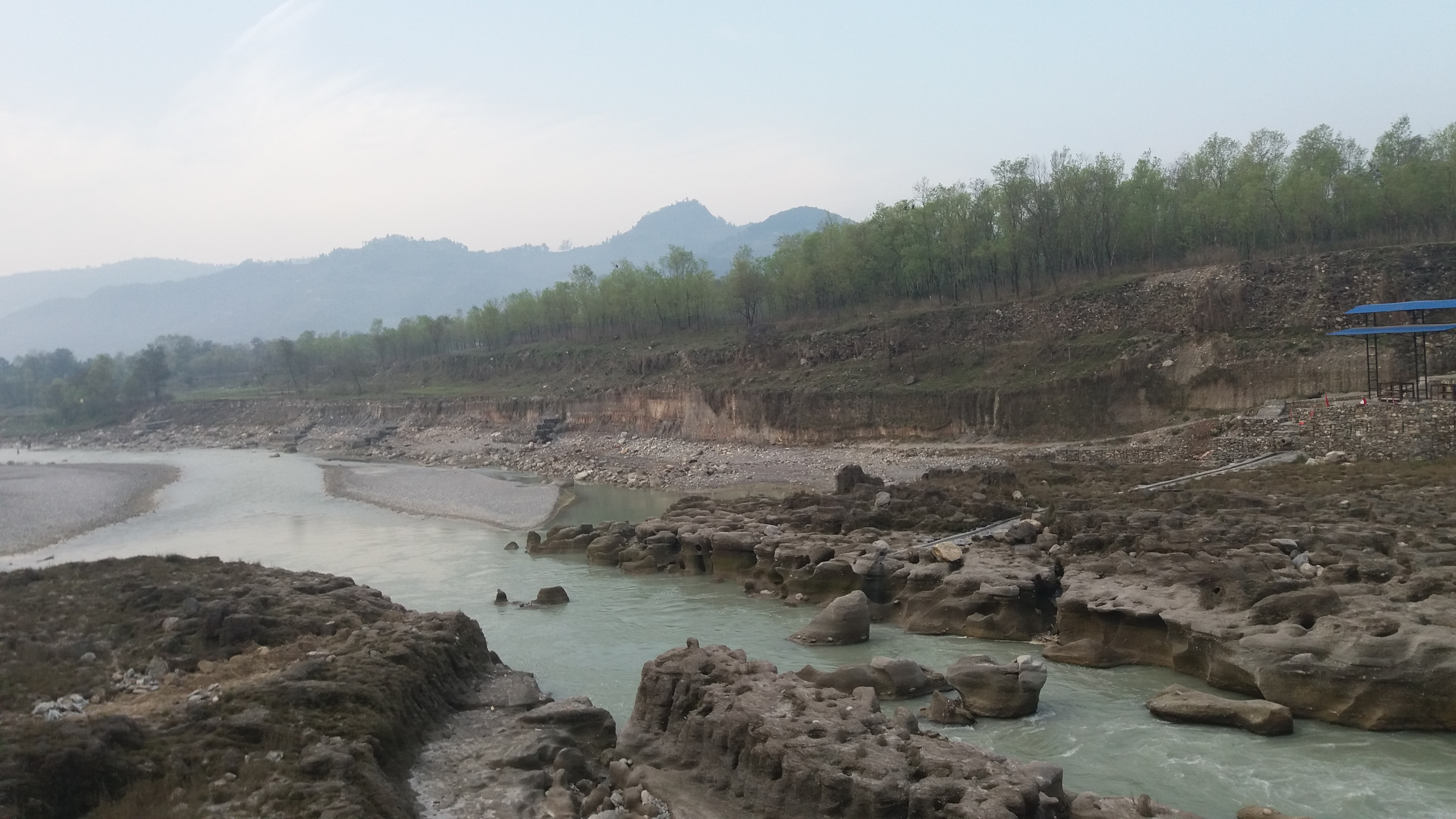
view of Seti River from Tanahun

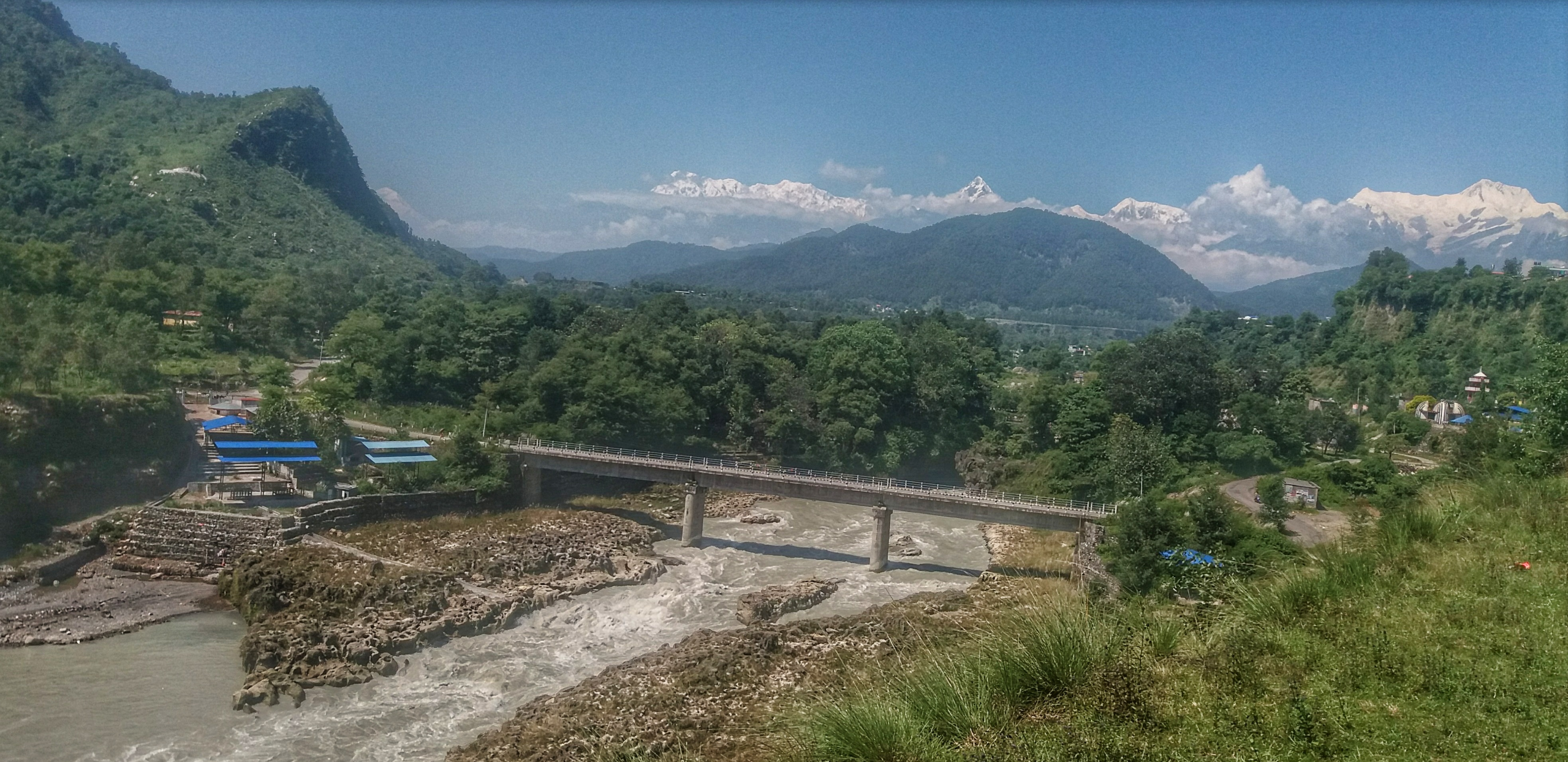
Seti visible from Tanahun Dulegonda

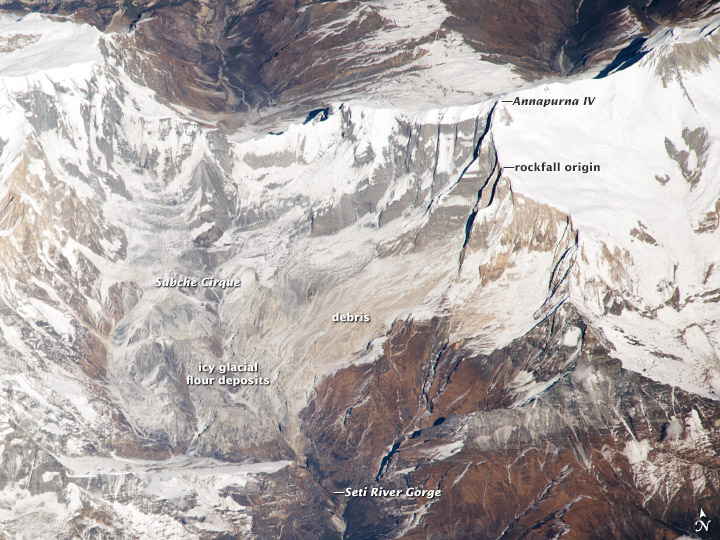
The rockfall that temporarily blocked the river
