= Gairapatan =

Location in Pokhara, Nepal

Gairapatan is the name of Ward Number 4 in Pokhara Metropolitan City in Nepal. Parts of Chipledhunga is located in this ward.
