= Chipledhunga =

Chipledhunga चिप्ले ढुङ्गा
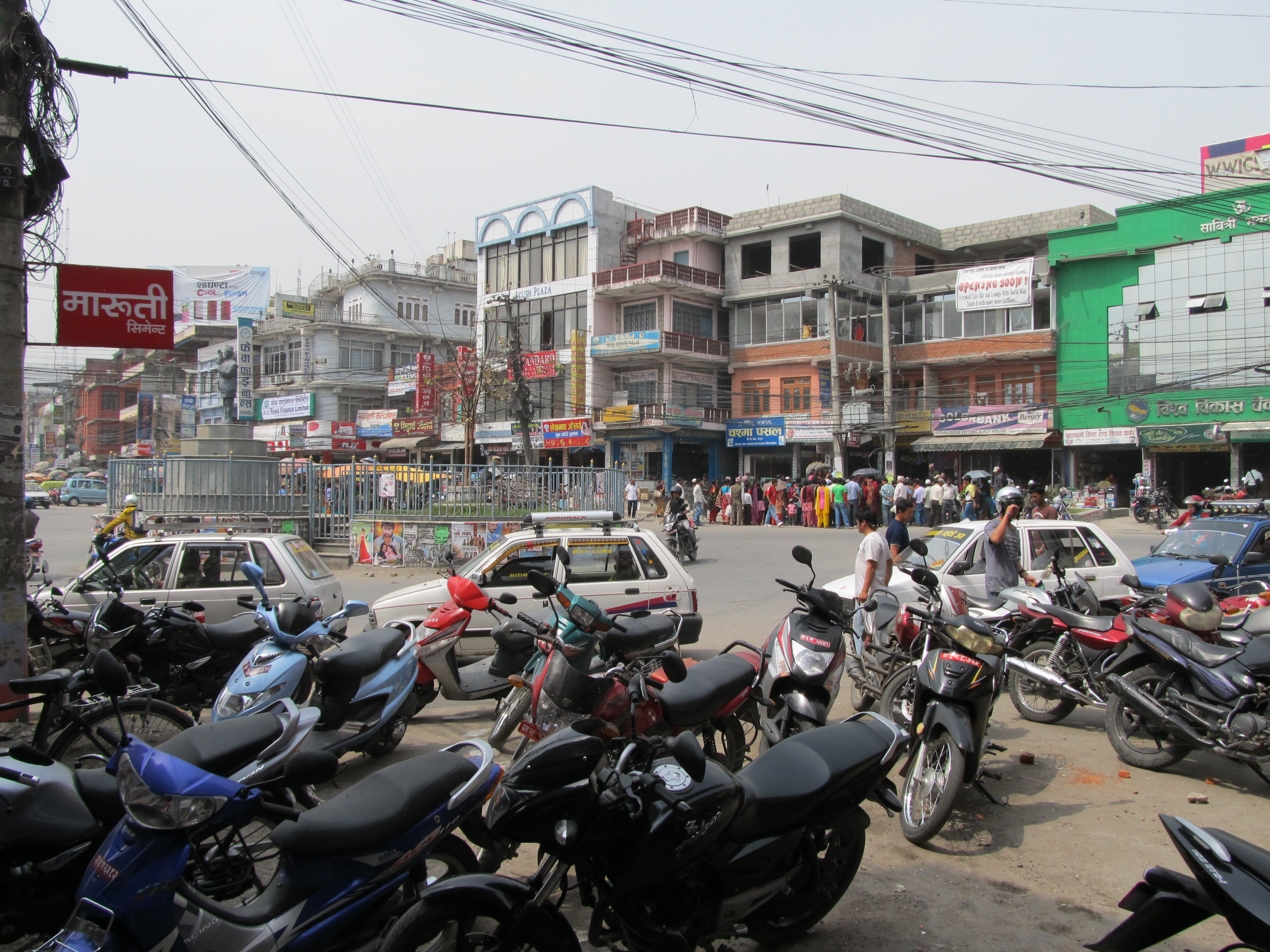
- Chipledhunga

- Map showing mahendrapool in Nepal Chipledhunga (Nepal)
- Coordinates: 28°13′28″N 83°59′20″E
- Country: Nepal
- Province: Gandaki
- District: Kaski District
- Time zone: UTC+5:45 (Nepal Time)
- Postal code: 33700
- Area code: 061

Chipledhunga (Nepali: चिप्ले ढुङ्गा) is the financial hub and busiest place of Pokhara, Nepal. It is one of the most frequented marketplaces in the whole of Pokhara, offering a wide range of goods and services, from clothing and banking to jewellery and electronics. It is one of the oldest and busiest marketplaces in the city. Chipledhunga has been one of the city's main marketplaces since ancient times.

== Origin of the name ==
Chipledhunga means "Slippery Stone" in Nepalese Language. The name is derived from the large slippery stone situated at this place.

== Boundaries of Chipledhunga ==
East: Mahendrapul
West: Siddhartha Chowk
North: Gairapatan
South: New Road

== Gallery ==
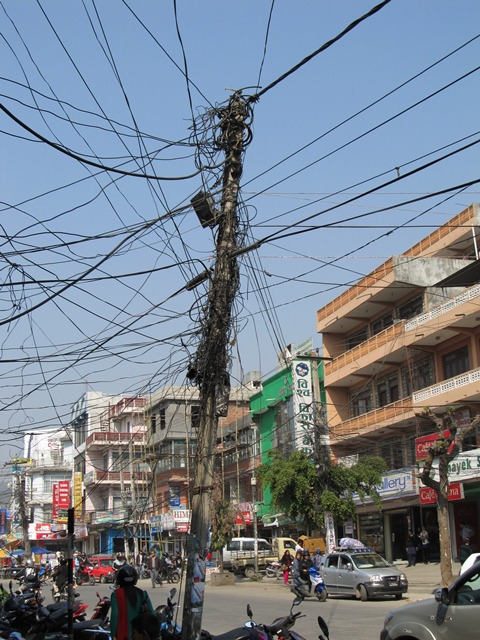

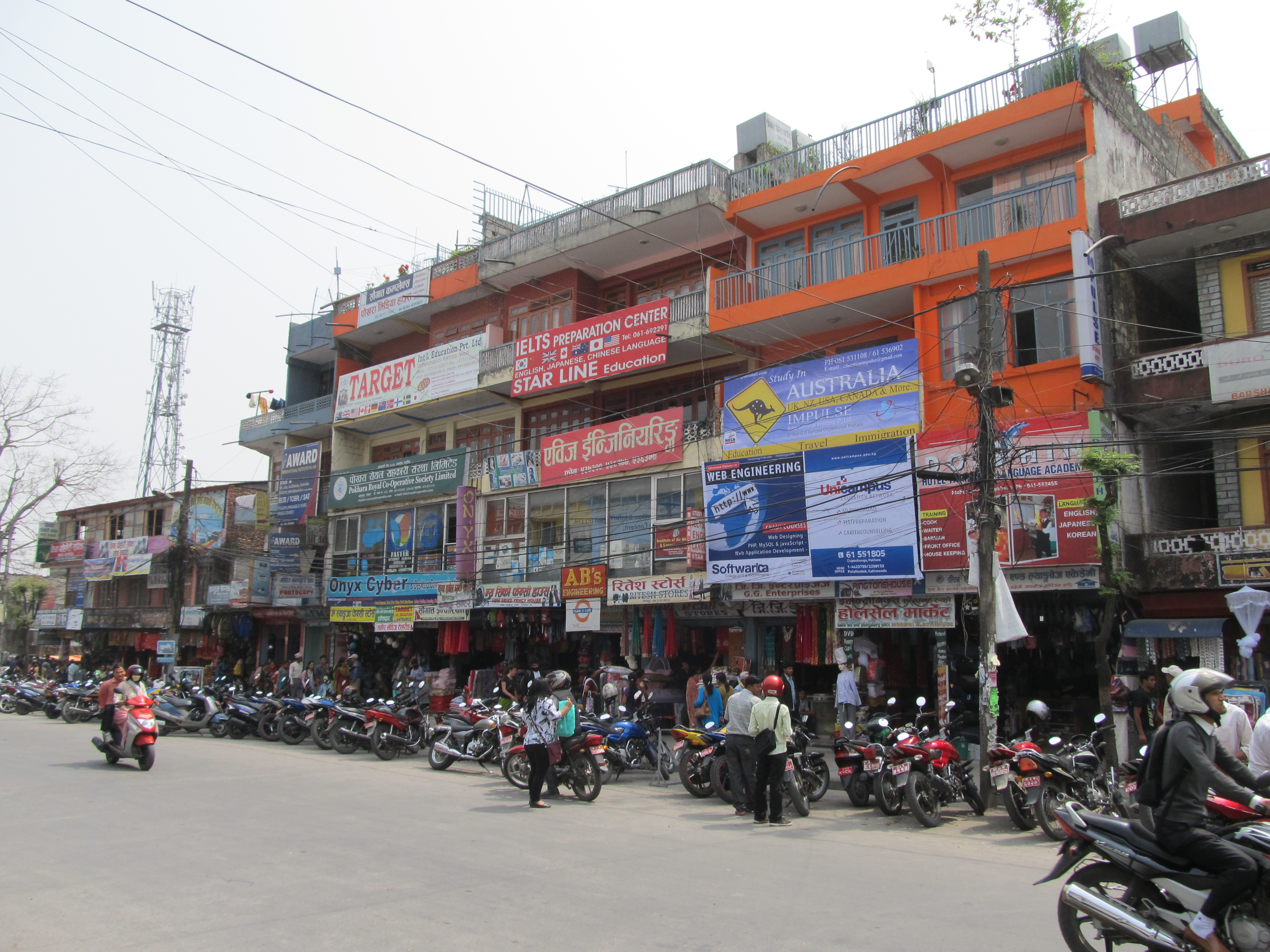

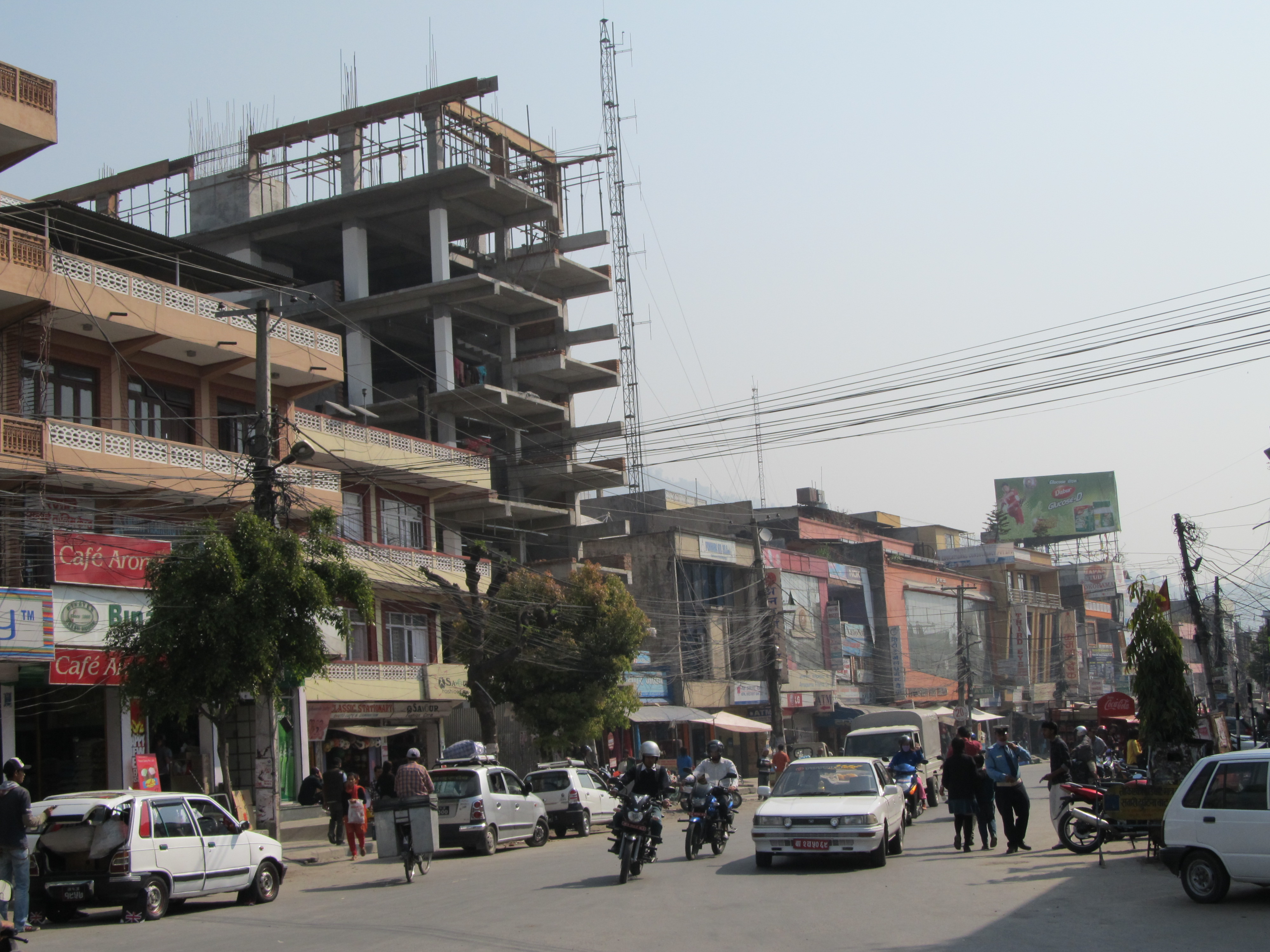
