= Miya Patan =

Miya Patan मिया पाटान
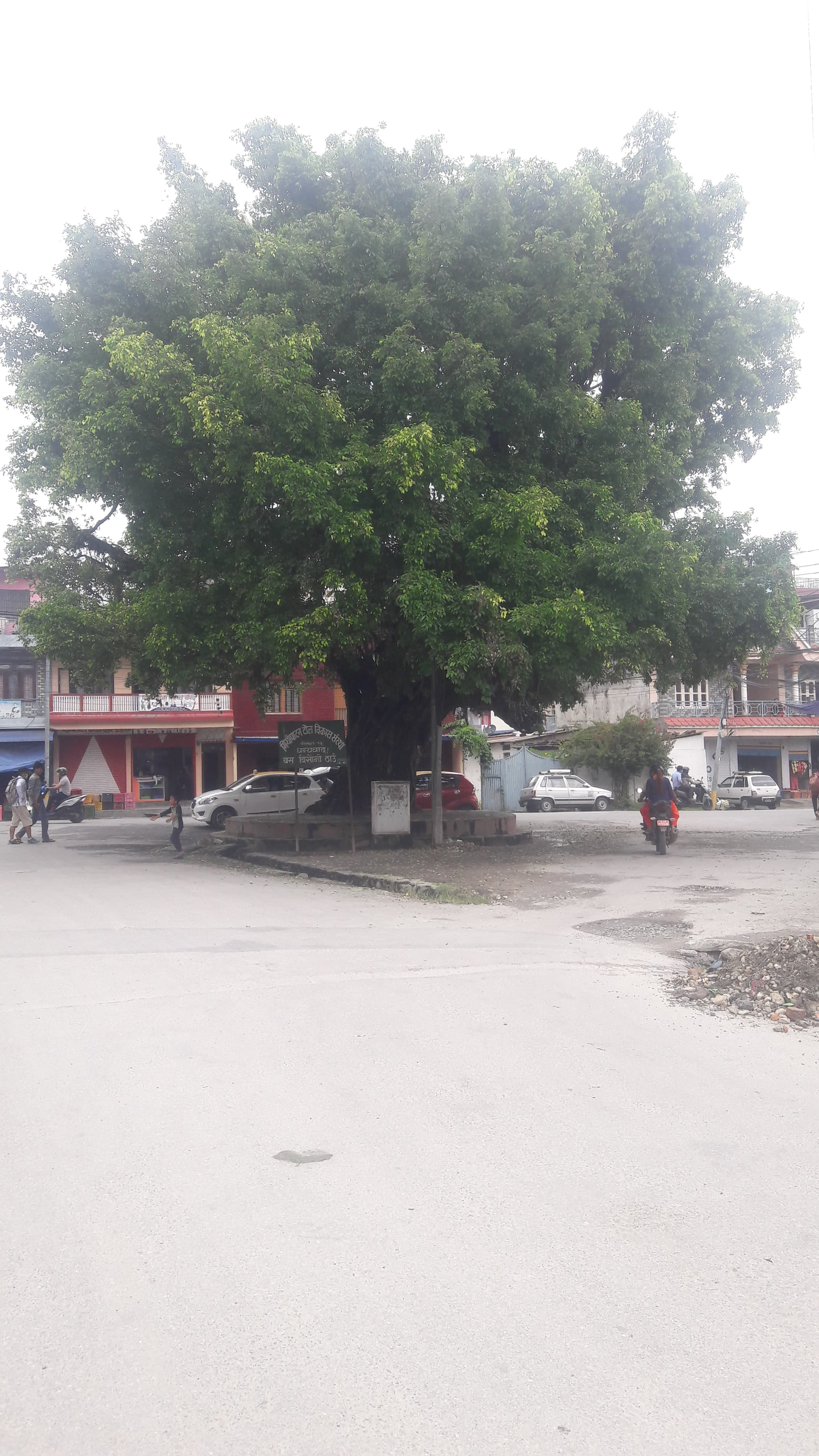

- Miyapatan Miya Patan (Nepal)
- Coordinates: 28.2084504°N 84.009747°E
- Country: Nepal
- Province: Gandaki
- City: Pokhara
- Ward No: 13

Population
  - Total: 17,077
- Time zone: +5:45 (Nepali Time)

Miya Patan (Nepali: मिया पाटान) is the residential area which is located in Ward number 13 of Pokhara Metropolitan City in Nepal. Aqsa Masjid is located near this place.

== Office ==
Ward 13 Office : Ward 13 office is situated at Miya Patan.
