= Bhimsen Temple =

Hindu temple in Nalamukh, Pokhara, Nepal

The Bhimsen Mandir or Bhimsen Temple is an 18th-century Hindu temple located in Nalamukh, Pokhara, Nepal. Bhimsen is the patron deity of people of Newari ethnicity. The temple like many in Nepal has erotic carvings on the struts.
