= Ranipauwa, Pokhara =

Ranipauwa रानीपौवा
- Location in Nepal Ranipauwa (Nepal)
- Coordinates: 28.2199°N 83.9976°E
- Country: Nepal
- Province: Gandaki
- City: Pokhara
- Time zone: +5:45 (Nepali Time)
- Website: http://pokharamun.gov.np/

Ranipauwa (Nepali: रानीपौवा) is the name of Ward Number 11 in Pokhara Metropolitan City in Nepal. It is a residential area.

== Boundaries of Ranipauwa ==
East: Matepani
West: Mahendrapul
North: Phulbari
South: Hospital Chowk
