= New Road (Pokhara) =

New Road नयाँ सडक
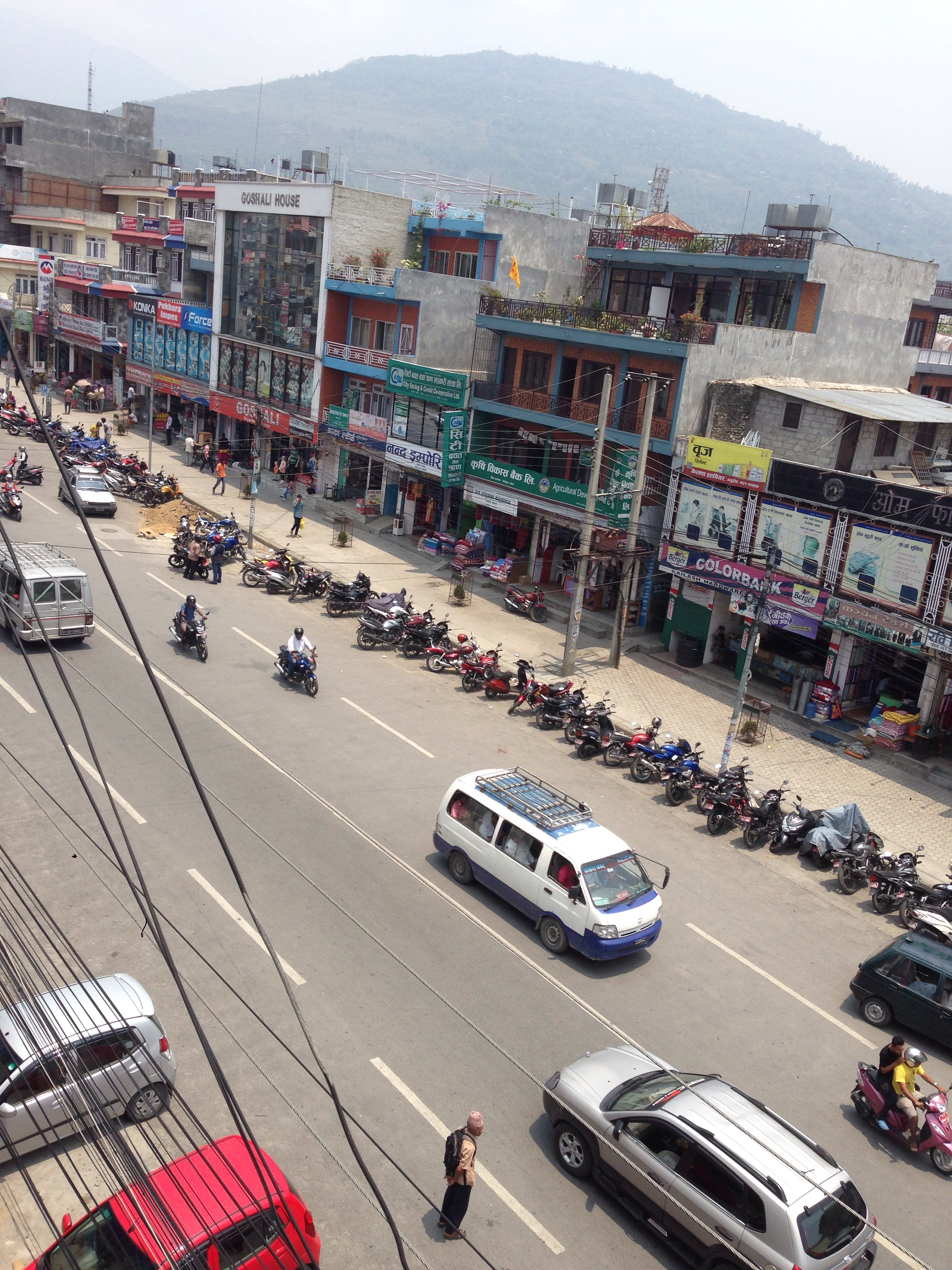
- Country: Nepal
- Province: Gandaki
- City: Pokhara
- Time zone: +5:45 (Nepali Time)
- Website: http://pokharamun.gov.np/

New Road (Nepali: नयाँ सडक) is the busiest street of Pokhara city, Nepal. It refers to a four-lane street from Chipledhunga to Sabhagriha Chowk, which is 1.5 km long. Its surrounding is one of the fastest-growing places in Pokhara.

Along with the new road, there are government offices, banks, clothing stores, supermarkets, schools, hardware stores, video and photography studios, and beauty parlors, among others.

== Boundaries of New Road ==
East: Naya Bazar
West: Aalu maila
North: Chipledhunga
South: Sabhagriha Chowk
