= Bindhyabasini Temple =

Hindu temple in Nepal

- बिन्ध्यबासिनी मन्दिर
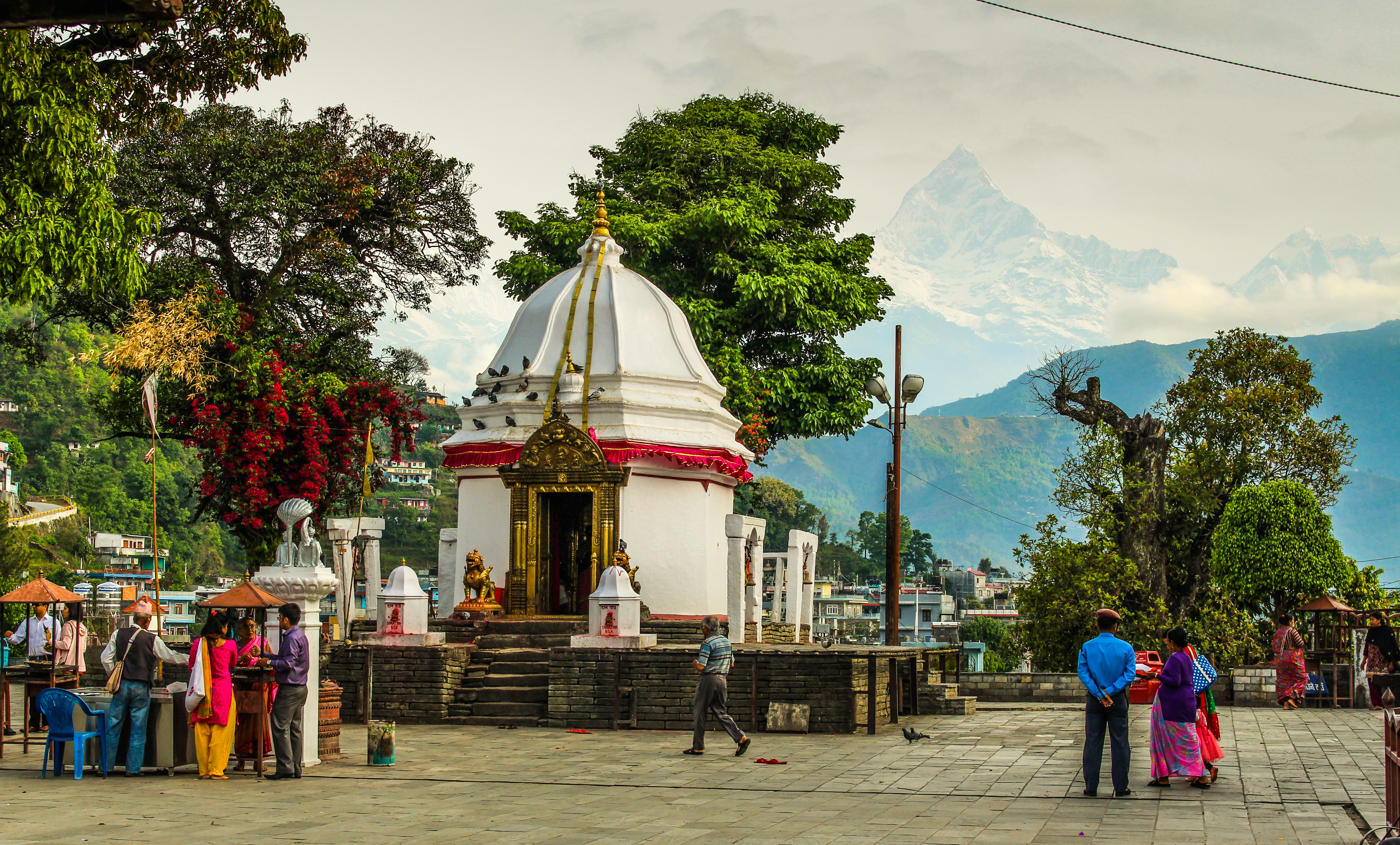
- Bindhyabasini Temple, associated with Goddess Durga

- Location in Nepal

Religion
- Affiliation: Hinduism
- District: Kaski
- Province: Gandaki Pradesh
- Deity: Bindhyabasini
- Festivals: Fulpati, Mahanawami, Shivaratri
- Governing body: Bindhyabasini Dharmik Chettra Bikash Samiti (बिन्ध्यबासिनी धार्मिक छेत्र बिकाश समिति)

Location
- Location: Pokhara
- Country: Nepal
- Interactive map of Bindhyabasini Temple
- Coordinates: 28.2378°N 83.9842°E

Architecture
- Type: Shikhara
- Completed: c 1760

Specifications
- Site area: 27,471 m²
- Temple: 6
- Elevation: 915 m (3,002 ft)

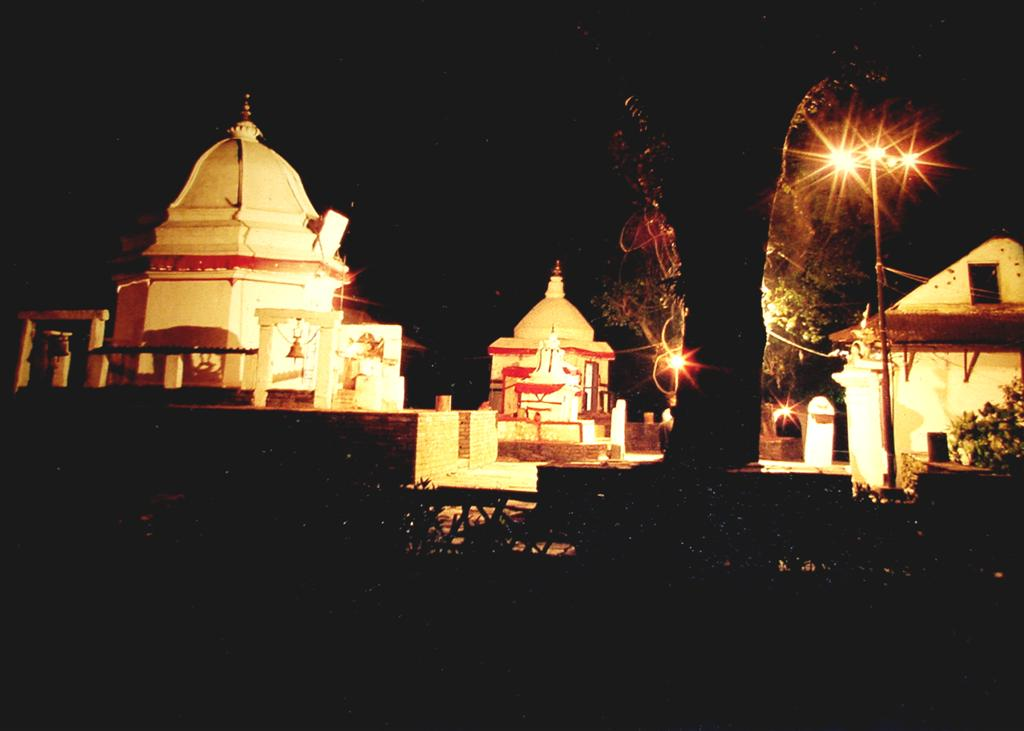
The Bindhyabasini temple in the evening

The Bindhyabasini Temple (Nepali: बिन्ध्यबासिनी मन्दिर) is one of the oldest and most prominent Hindu temples in Pokhara, Nepal. Situated in Ward No. 2, Miruwa of Pokhara in Kaski District, Gandaki Province, the temple is dedicated to Goddess Bindhyabasini, a manifestation of Durga. It serves as an important religious site, attracting devotees and visitors from across Nepal and abroad throughout the year. The temple complex also includes shrines dedicated to other Hindu deities, such as Saraswati, Shiva, Hanuman, and Ganesha. Located atop a small hill, the temple can be accessed via stone staircases from the east, north, and southeast. Near the entrance, a statue of Lord Hanuman covered in Sindoor next to the temple of Lord Ganesha welcomes devotees to the temple.

== History ==
=== Establishment ===
The Bindhyabasini temple was established around the 1760s. In June 1815 A.D., King Girvan Yuddha Bikram Shah of Nepal appointed Kahindra Padhya Poudel as the temple priest replacing Harivamsha Padhya. The priest was allowed to use the Guthi lands endowed to the temple to perform regular and ceremonial puja. The temple itself was built in 1842 B.S. on 47 ropanis of land.

=== Legend ===
Goddess Bindhyabasini is regarded as a form of Yogamaya, the divine infant born alongside Krishna as the eighth child of Devaki and Vasudeva in Mathura. To protect Krishna from the tyrannical king Kamsa, who had imprisoned Devaki and Vasudeva to kill their prophesied child, Vasudeva exchanged Krishna with the newborn daughter of Yashoda in Gokul. When Kamsa attempted to kill the substitute child by striking her against a stone, she transformed into a celestial goddess, evading his grasp. She then foretold his eventual defeat and ascended to the heavens. She later took residence in the Bindhya mountains of India, where she is worshipped as Bindhyabasini, meaning "she who dwells in the Bindhyas".

According to legend, King Siddhi Narayan Shah of Kaski, while on a pilgrimage to the Bindhyabasini Temple in Vindhyachal, Uttar Pradesh, India, had a dream inspiring him to bring the goddess's presence to his kingdom. Other accounts attribute the vision to King Khadgaman Malla of Parbat, who similarly directed the relocation of her idol. Envoys sent to India retrieved a sacred statue of the goddess, but upon reaching the hilltop in present-day Pokhara, the statue could not be moved. This was interpreted as a divine sign, indicating the location as the goddess's chosen abode. So, the king directed his people to establish the temple there. Since then, this place has been a significant hub for devotees. The meaning of “Bindhya” means the incarnation of goddess and “Basini” means the dweller of a place.

=== Fire of 1949 ===
Most of Pokhara city was destroyed in the fire of 1949 and the fire was allegedly started in Bindhyabasini temple while performing an offering which later spread out of control.

== Architecture ==
There's no information about the style of the original temple (and it is assumed to have been rebuilt at some point) but the current temple is in Shikhara style. Shikhara style of temple architecture is considered older than the much prevalent Pagoda architecture.

Two golden metal lions stand beside the temple gate, while the sound of metal gong bells can frequently be heard in the background. At a glance, Bindhyabasini Temple is a simple yet striking monument. The local “Dharmik Chhetra Bikas Samiti” regulates the temple.

== Buildings in the premises ==
- Saraswati Mandir (सरस्वती मन्दिर)
- Hanuman Mandir (हनुमान मन्दिर)
- Shiva Mandir (शिव मन्दिर)
- Bindhyabasini Sanskrit Vidyalaya (बिन्ध्यबासिनी मन्दिर)
- Vishnu Mandir (विष्णु मन्दिर)
- Ganesh Mandir (गणेश मदिर)
- Jogi Paati (जोगी पाटी)
- Book Stores (किताब पसल)
- Photoshoot Area (फोटो शूट पसल)

== Temple Area Management ==
The temple is currently managed by Bindhyabasini Dharmik Chettra Bikash Samiti which has carried out several improvements and upgraded the area. Examples include the establishment of Gurukul Bhawan (गुरुकुल भवन), upgrades to various smaller temples in the area, upgrade of Bindhyabasini park below the temple area, etc.

== Accessibility ==
A lift with a capacity of 12 people was installed in the temple premises, and inaugurated by the President of Nepal on March 7, 2019. The lift is primarily used by disabled pilgrims and seniors.

A Senior Citizens Friendship Center was established in January 2016. The facility allows for a meeting point for senior citizens, provides food every day to those who attend, and arranges for talks on a variety of subjects.

== In the news ==
- The royal couple of former King Gyanendra and Queen Komal did puja at the temple on March 27, 2004.
- Indian Army Chief comes visiting, locals know he speaks fluent Nepali on February 13, 2018.
- Navadurga Festival was organized by Bindhyabasini Dharmik Chhettra Bikash Samiti on September 21, 2017.

== See also ==
- List of Hindu temples in Nepal
