= Bagar, Pokhara =

Bagar is the name of Ward Number 1 in Pokhara Metropolitan City in Nepal. Prithivi Narayan Campus is located in this ward.
