= Nadipur =

Nadipur is the name of Ward Number 3 in the metropolitan city of Pokhara, Nepal.

Seti Hydropower Station is located in the ward.

The ward's schools are Bal Mandir Secondary School, Kanya Ma Vj, Shree Gyanbhumi Madhyamik Bidhyalay, Prativa Madhyamik Bidhyalay, Kanya Campus Pokhara, Mount Annapurna Secondary School, Sharada English Boarding School and a Montessori school, Fulbari Montessori.

Near the east of Nadipur lies the well known Nadipur Bridge of Pokhara, a type of arch bridge. Just to the north of the bridge lie Shree Narayan Temple (नारायण मन्दिर) and Sani Sankata Temple (शनि संकटा मन्दिर). Near the Tersapati area of Nadipur, on the side of the road lies Shree Saraswoti Temple (श्री सरस्वती मन्दिर) and Devi Rama Bhagwati Mandir (देवी राम भगवती मन्दिर).

North, towards Shree Gyanbhumi Madhyamik Bidhyalay, there is a popular courtyard which contains a departmental store, a computer store, and others.
