= Miruwa =

Miruwa मिरुवा
- Ward No. 2
- Miruwa
- Country: Nepal
- Province: Gandaki Province
- District: Kaski District
- Metropolitan City: Pokhara

Government
  - Ward Chair: Diwas Man Pradhananga
  - वडा अध्यक्ष: दिवस मान प्रधानांग

Population
  - Total: 10,100
- Geocode: 28.241983, 83.982758

Miruwa (Nepali: मिरुवा) is the name of Ward Number 2 in Pokhara Metropolitan City in Nepal. It is one of the central urban wards of Pokhara. Bindhyabasini temple is located in this ward.
