= Mahendrapul =

Mahendrapul महेन्द्र पुल
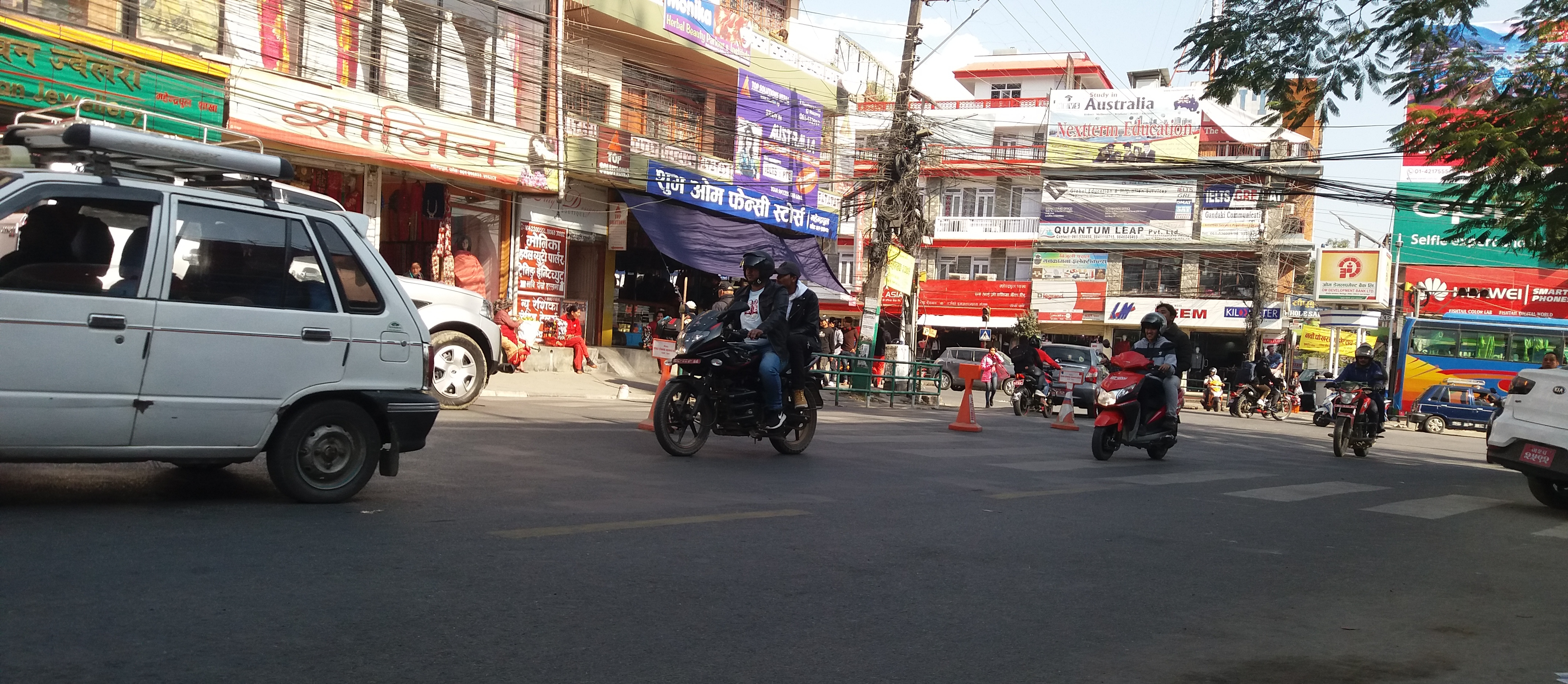
- Mahendrapul

- Location within Gandaki Province Location within Nepal
- Coordinates: 28.2256°N 83.9910°E
- Country: Nepal
- Province: Gandaki
- District: Kaski District
- Time zone: UTC+5:45 (Nepal Time)
- Postal code: 33700
- Area code: 061
- Vehicle registration: GA-00

Mahendrapul (Nepali: महेन्द्र पुल) is the financial hub and the busiest high street of Pokhara. It is one of the oldest and busiest marketplaces in the city and one of its central locations. It is named after the Mahendrapul Bridge over Seti River. The bridge links Ranipauwa to Mahendrapool.

== Origin of the name ==
Mahendra means the name of Late King Mahendra Bir Bikram Shah and Pul means Bridge.

== Boundaries of Mahendrapul ==
East: Ranipauwa
West: Chipledhunga
North: Palekhe Chowk
South: Naya Bazar
