= Kaskikot =

Kaskikot कास्कीकोट
- Subdivision of Pokhara Metropolitan City
- Location in Nepal Kaskikot (Nepal)
- Coordinates: 28.27194°N 83.90139°E
- Country: Nepal
- Province: Gandaki Province
- District: Kaski District

Population (2015)
  - Total: 5,892
- Time zone: UTC+5:45 (Nepal Time)
- Postal code: 33711
- Website: http://ddckaski.gov.np/ne-vdc-information/

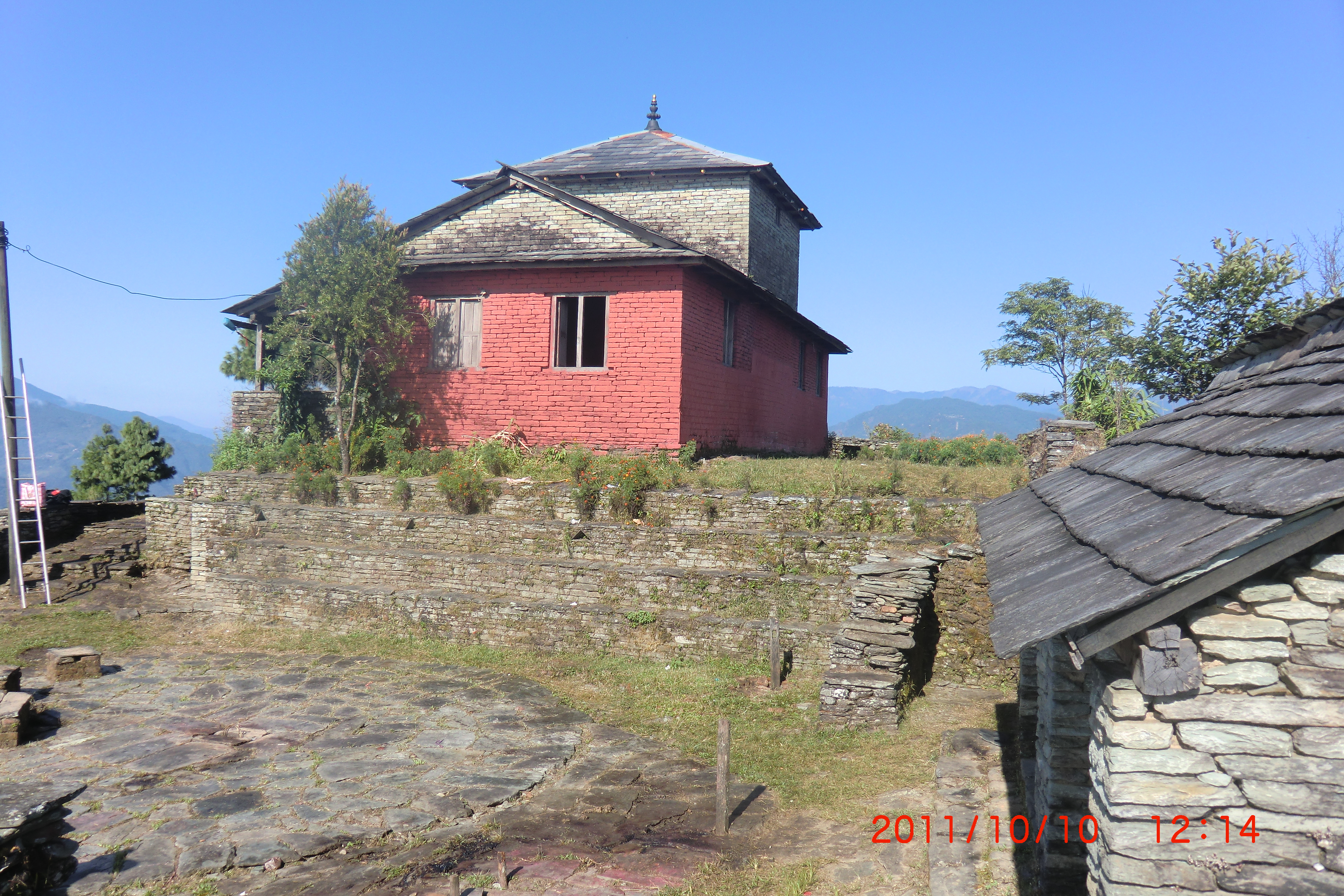
Kaskikot Ancient Palace

Kaskikot (Nepali: कास्कीकोट), commonly known as Kaski, is a Ward no. 24 of the Pokhara metropolitan city. It was earlier a part of the village development committee in Kaski District, a region in northern-central Nepal.

== Geography ==
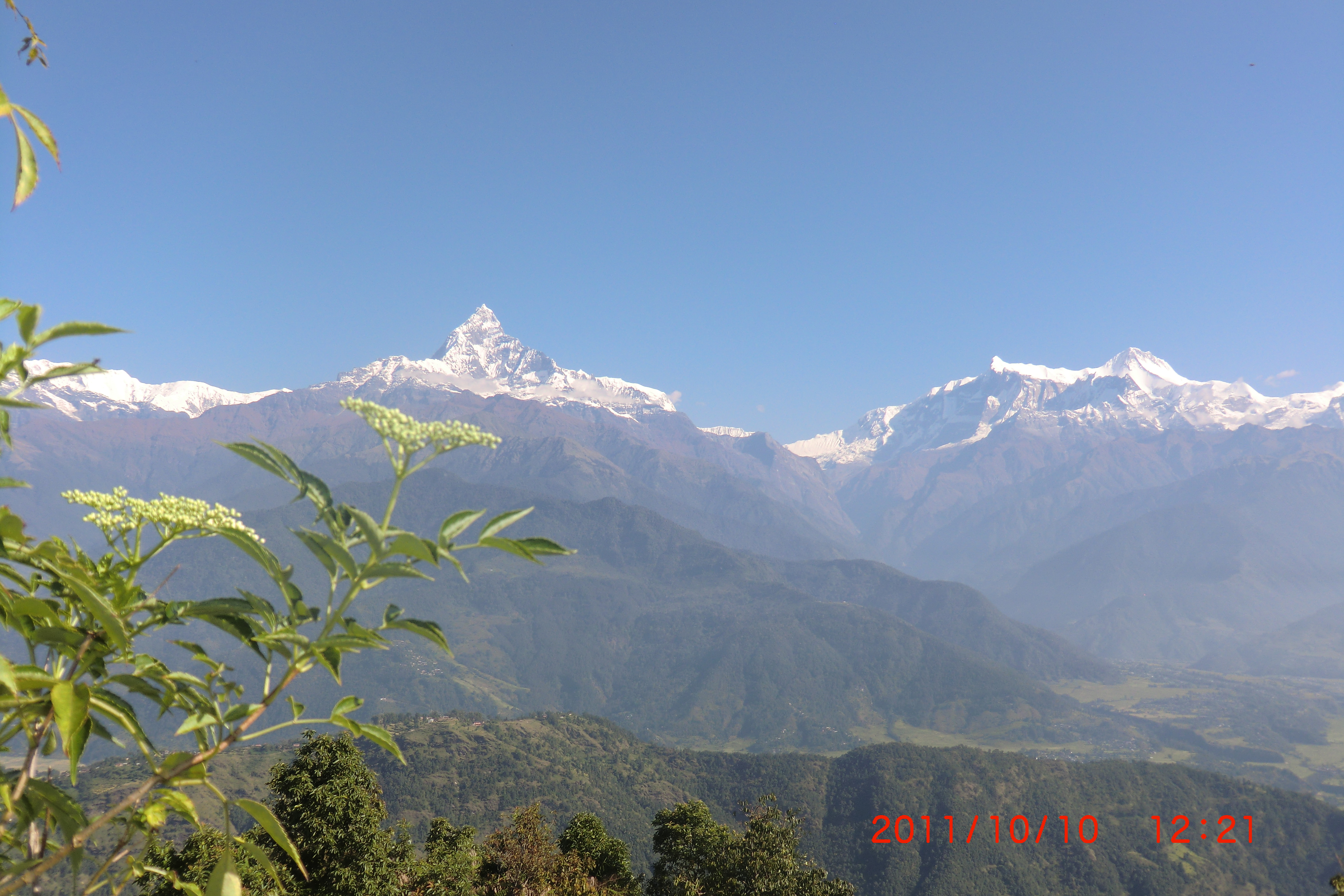
Annapurna Range visible from Kaskikot

Kaskikot is located in Annapurna Massif, north of Fewa Lake at a distance of 12 kilometers west of Pokhara after Sarangkot. It is on the trekking route to the Annapurna region. A mountainside ridge at an altitude of 1,788 meters, Kaskikot provides panoramic Himalayan views. On the northern side of Kaskikot, Dhawalagiri can be seen in the far west. The Annapurna mountain range is clearly visible on the same side. To the east, the village overlooks the city of Pokhara across Fewa Lake.

Kaskikot shares its territory with Sarangkot, Chapakot, Dhikurpokhari, and Hemja.

== History ==
Before the unification of Nepal, there were 24 small principalities in west Nepal, one of which was Kaski.

The ruins of the old palace of the rulers of Kaski still exist in the ward. The historical kingdom was an early homeland of the Shah dynasty. Kulamandan Shah Khand was one of the rulers who established his kingdom in western Nepal. His descendant Drabya Shah was the first to establish Gorkha, the source of the legendary Gorkha warriors.

During Dashain holidays, various cultural events can be witnessed. Kaskikot Kalika Temple lies in the historical palace located at the top of the hill (1700 meters). During Nava Durga, Dashain and Chaitra Dashain, Kaski Guthi Sanstha organizes worship to goddess Durga Bhawani. Many people gather in Kaskikot Temple during Dashain Fulpati and Chaitra Dashain.

== Population ==
At the time of the 1991 Nepal census, Kaskikot had a population of 6,075 people residing in 1,185 individual households. According to the census of 2011, the population has decreased to 5,892 people residing in 1,508 households. Most inhabitants depend on agriculture and are members of the Brahmin, Chhetri, Thakuri, Magar and Dalit castes.

== Economy ==
With the Annapurna and Dhaulagiri Himalayas clearly visible to the north, Kaskikot is a tourist destination. There are hotels and guest houses in Deurali and Maula, Nepal. A milk collection center is located in Guntechour, which supplies milk to Pokhara. There are also small industries like poultry farming and handicrafts. General stores provide necessary goods like oil, sugar, and salts to the community.

Kaskikot Women's Financial Organization, founded by Krishna Paudel, has around 1000 members. The Kalika Community Development Organization, located in Guntechour, engages in the development of the village. Numerous organizations and Youths Clubs also organize different cultural and development work around the village.

In addition, there are several Home Stay as well as coffee House which are dedicated to serve the domestic as well as international tourists in Kaskikot.Mr. Tika Ram Tripathi, serving organic and home grown aromatic coffee outside the pokhara valley.

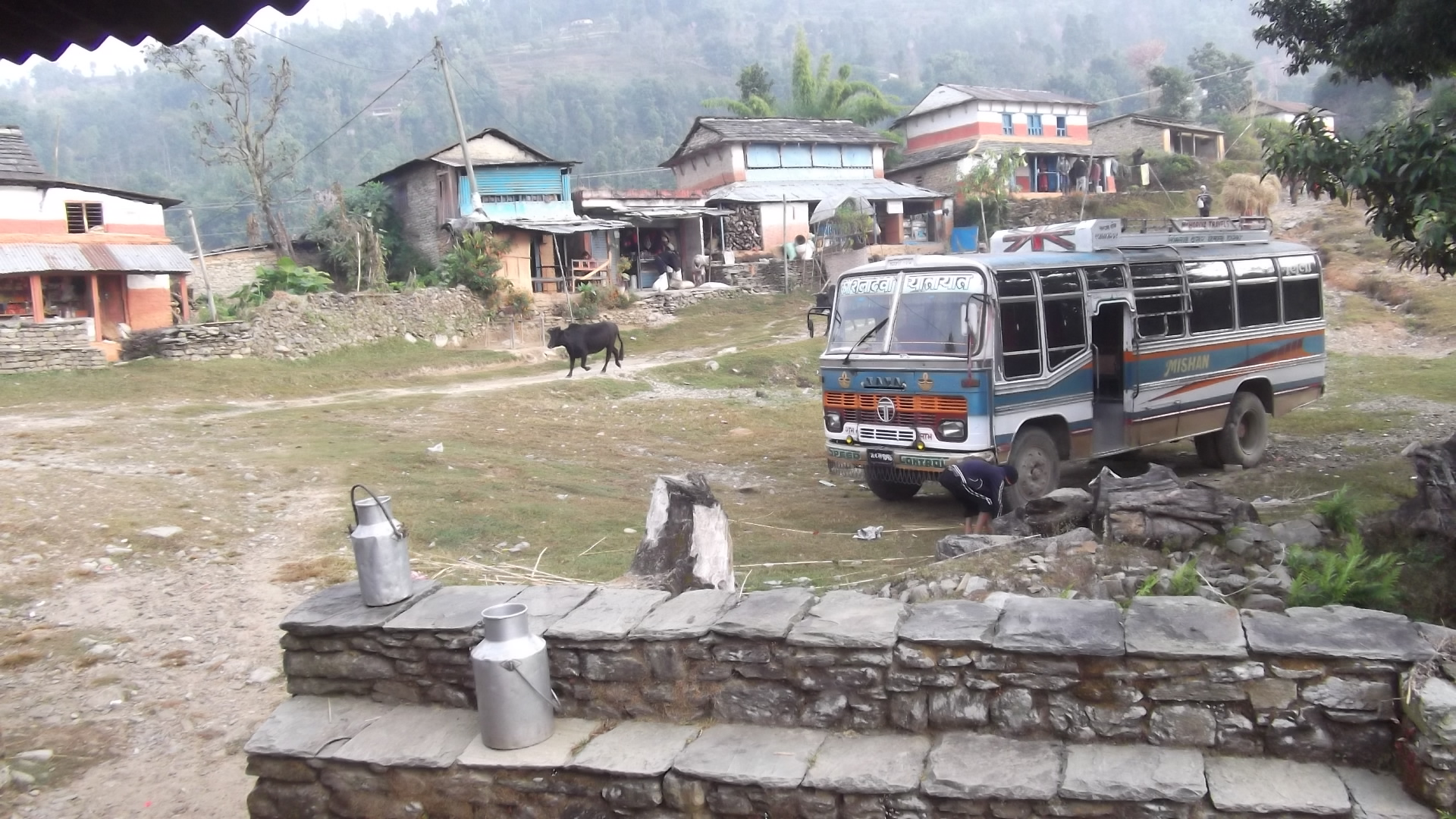
Kaskikot

== Village amenities ==
There are primary schools in every ward. Kalika Higher Secondary School, located at Mandredhunga is the only Higher education institution teaching up to Class 12. The other Siddha Bahara Lower Secondary School goes up to Class 8. There is also a private school, namely Shree Bishwajyoti English Boarding School, that goes up to Class 8.

There is a general health post equipped with primary medicine, which operates a monthly health camp around the village. A few health sub-posts provide free treatment and vaccination to children.

Kaskikot is connected by bus routes. Apart from buses, local agricultural transport jeeps also provide a semi-reliable transport service. There are four rough motor roads connecting Kaskikot. A major road connects Kaskikot to Pokhara and Sarangkot. The other road goes from the beach of Fewa Lake, next to the midway of the hill to Guntechour connecting Naudanda [krishi sadak].

== Gallery ==
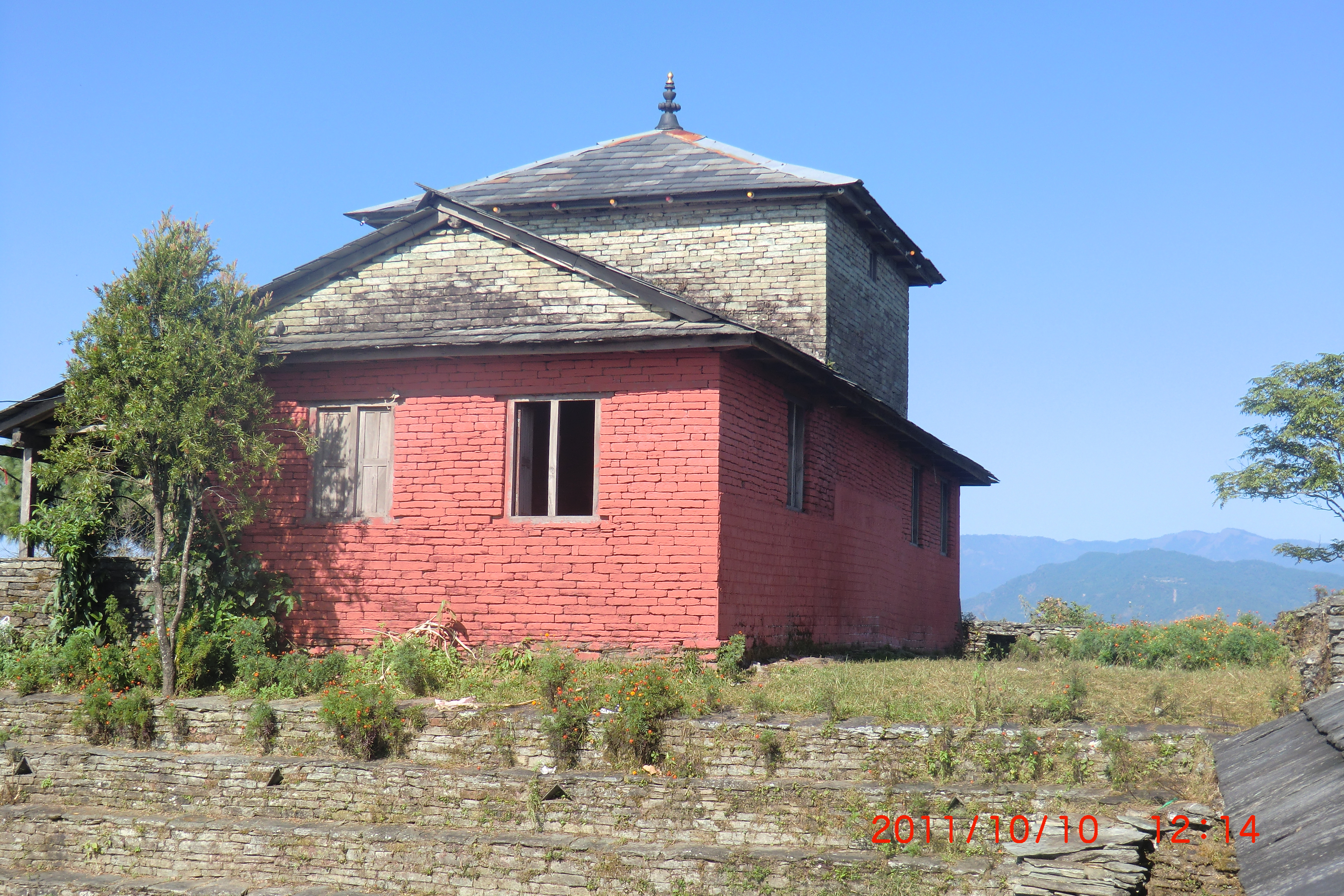
Kaskikot Temple

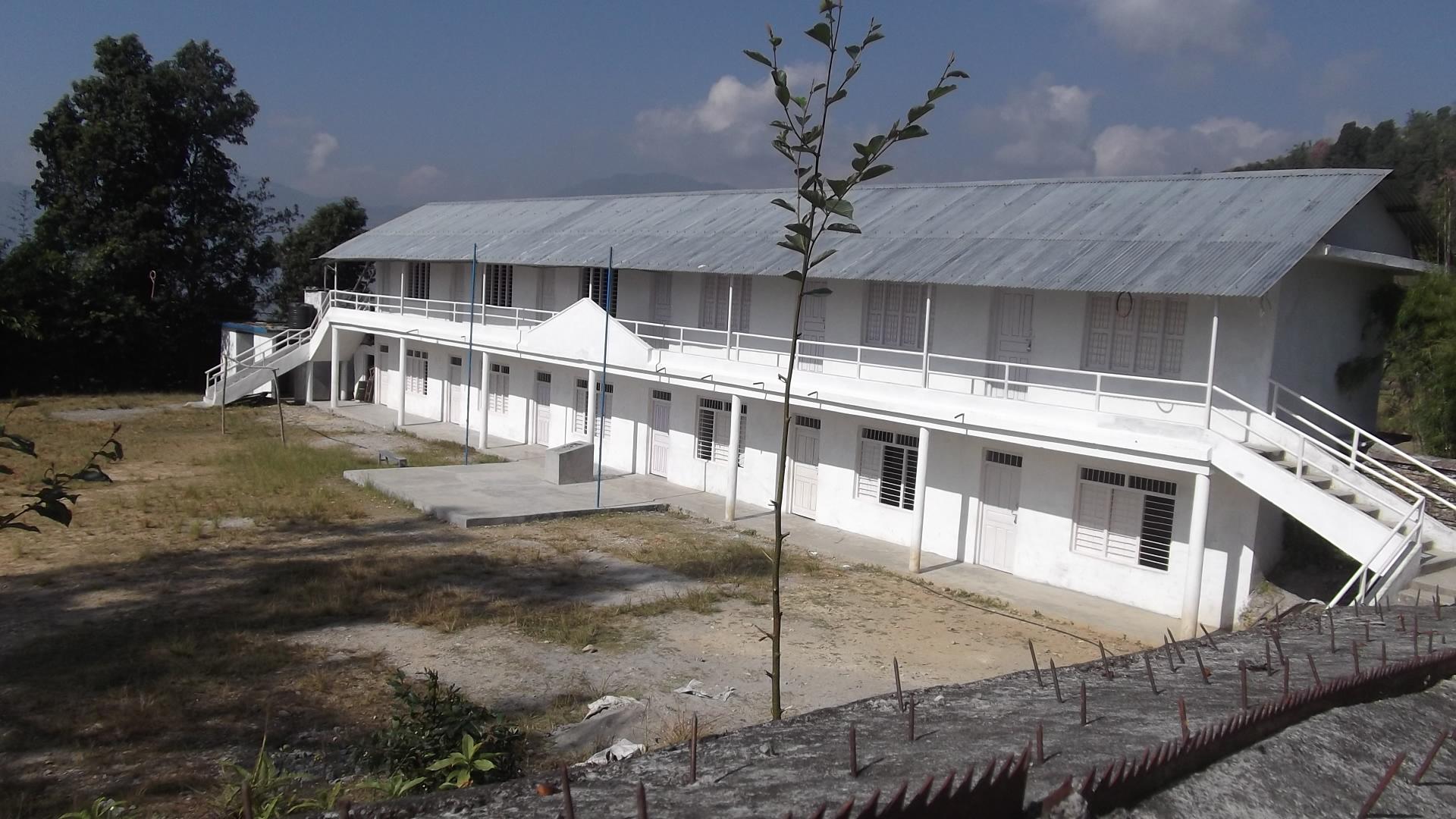
School at Guntechour, Kaskikot.

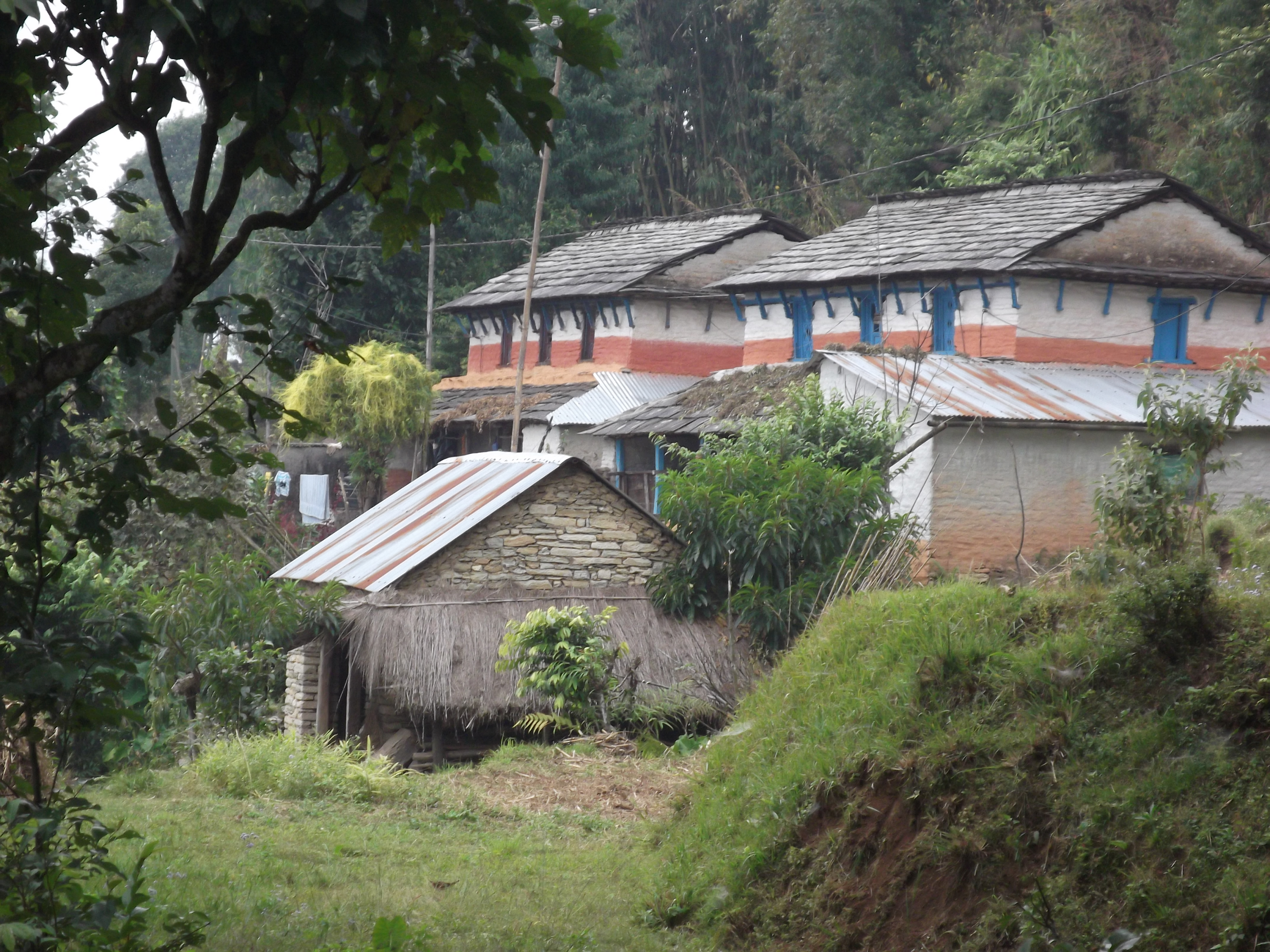
House in Kaskikot

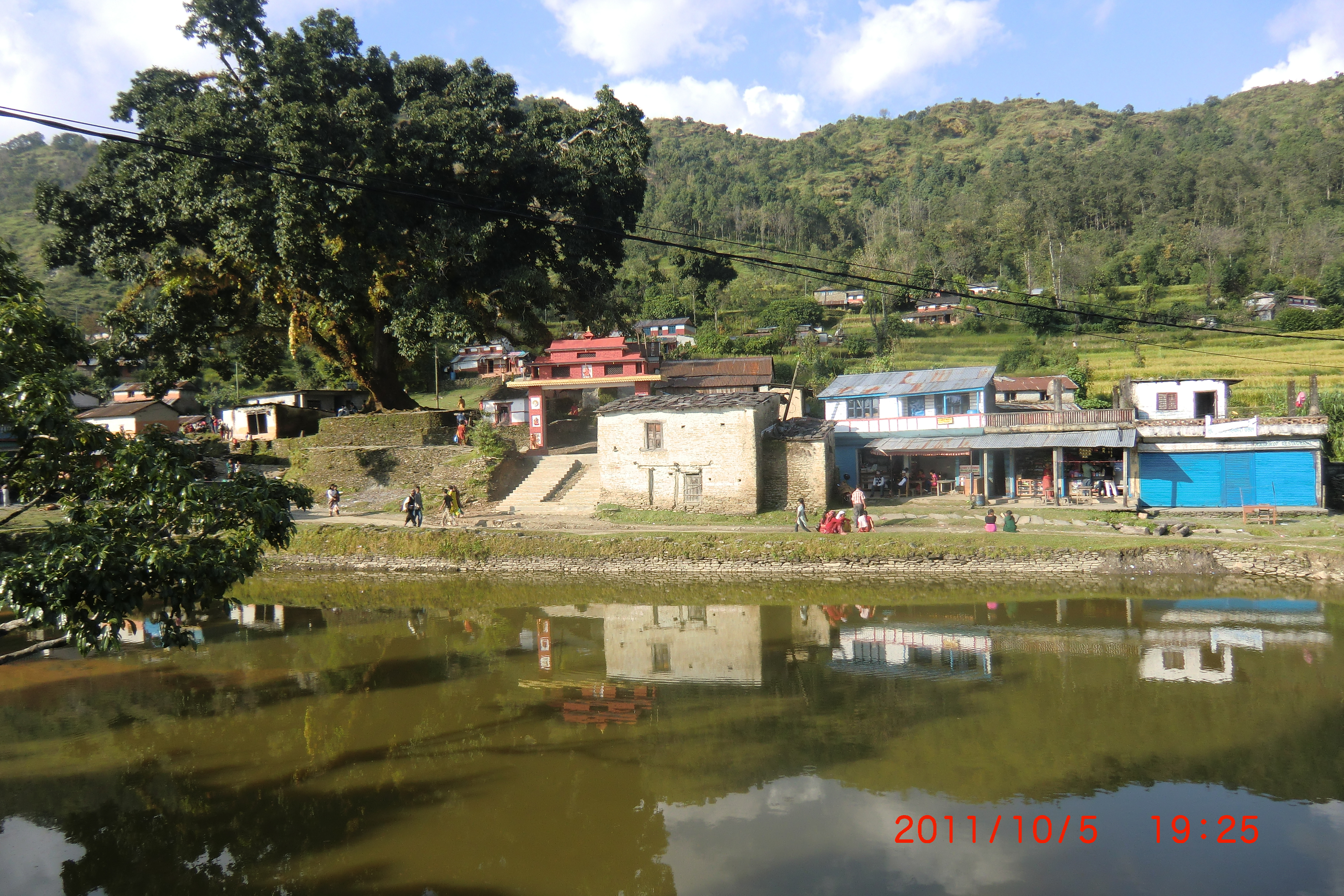
Thuli Pokhari During Winter.

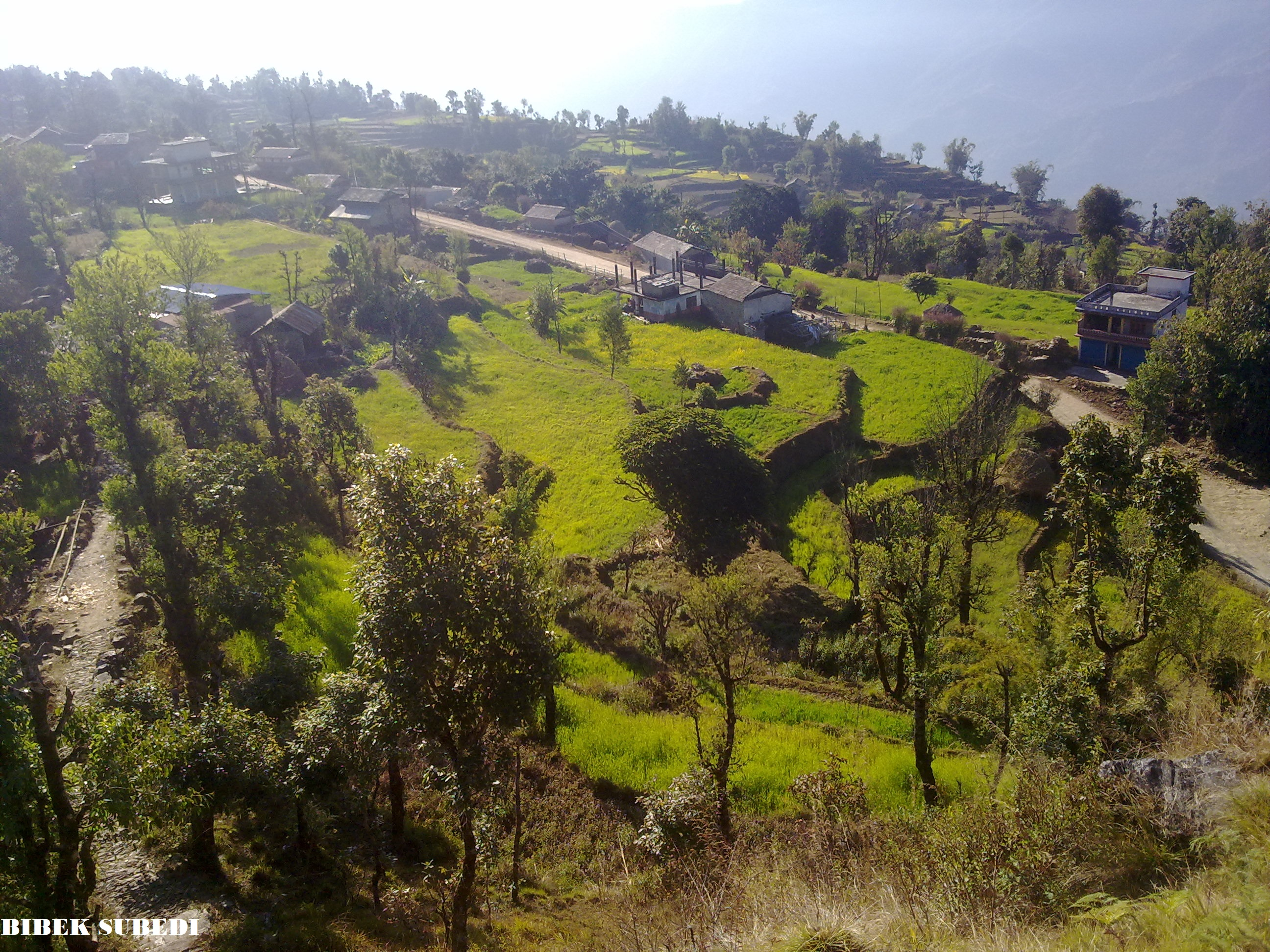
Kaskikot, Deurali

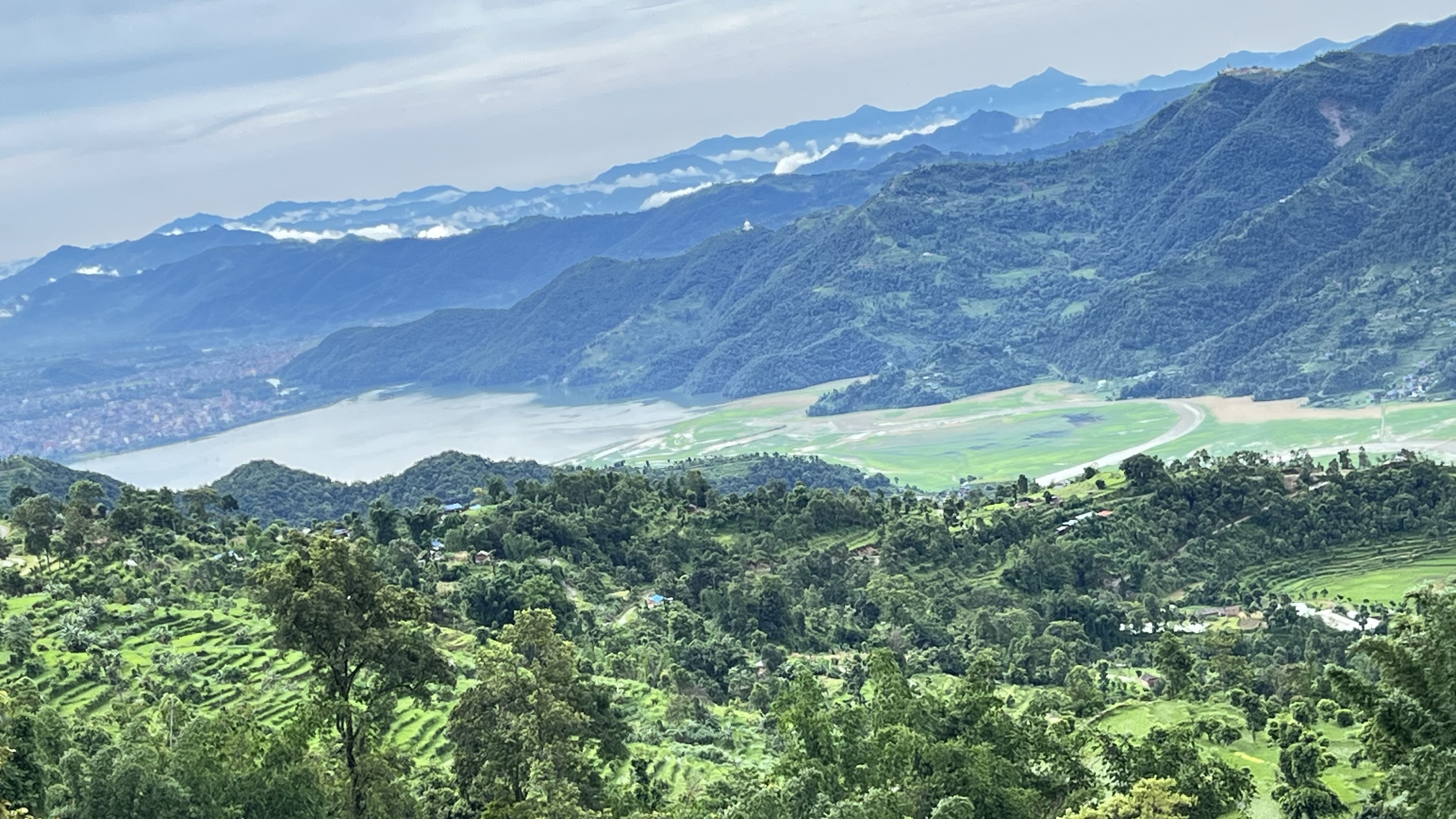
Basement of Kaskikot Village. Fewa Lake visible from Top of the hill.

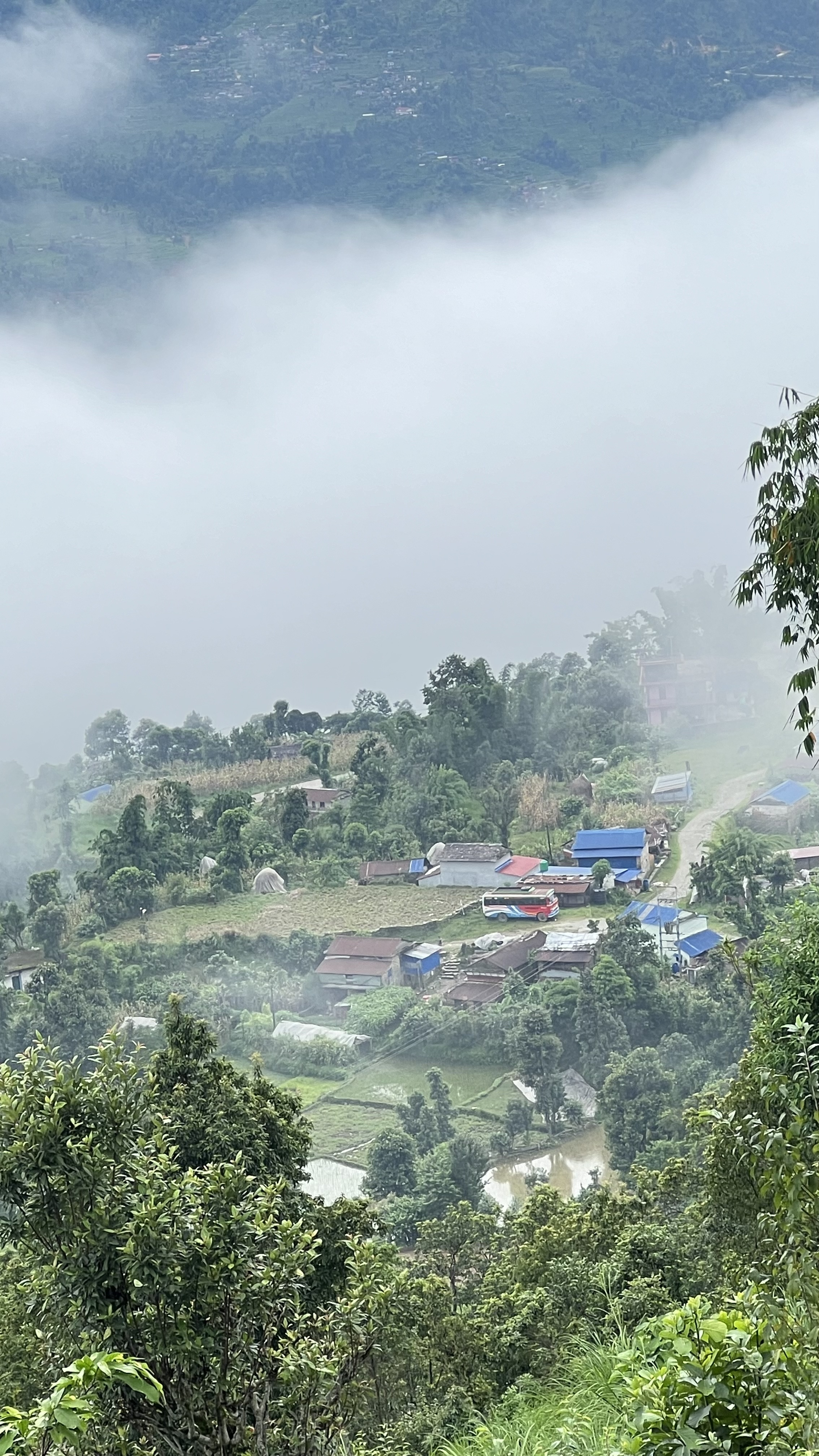
Center Village of Kaskikot, Guntechour from Kaskikot Hill.
