= Ratna Mandir =

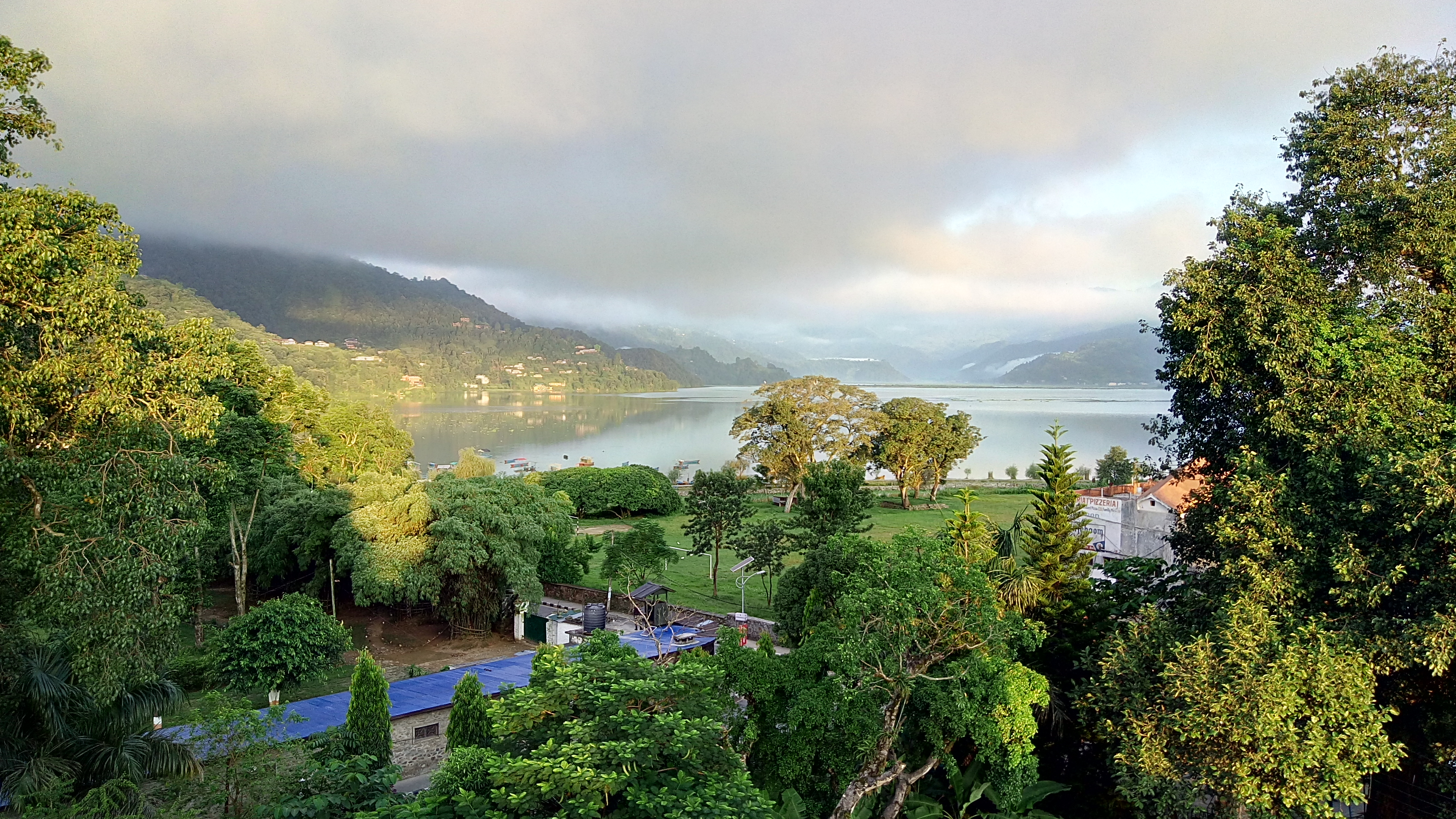
- Phewa Lake as seen from the Ratna Mandir Palace

General information
- Town or city: Pokhara
- Country: Nepal
- Coordinates: 28.206287550694263°N 83.95873551972058°E
- Named for: Queen Ratna
- Completed: 1956
- Owner: Government of Nepal

Ratna Mandir (Nepali: रत्न मन्दिर) is a former palace used by the Nepalese royal family.

It is located near the Phewa Lake in Pokhara, Gandaki Province, Nepal. Ratna Mandir was built in 1956 by King Mahendra for his wife Ratna, and the palace is spread over 56,468 square meters.
