= Phewa Lake =

Lake in Nepal

- Phewa Tal, Baidam Tal
- फेवा ताल (Nepali)
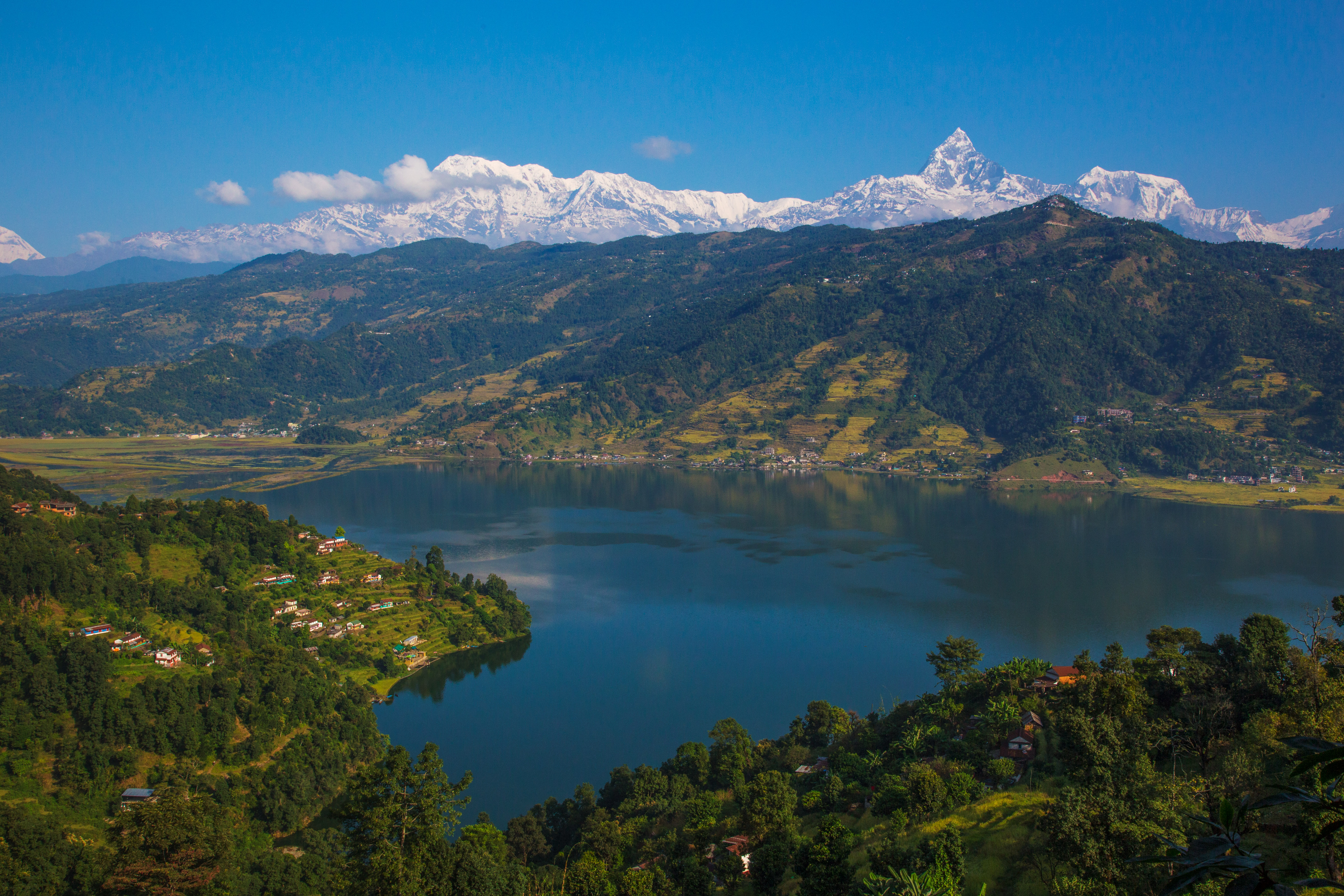
- Reflection of the Annapurna Range on Phewa Lake

- Location in Nepal
- Interactive map of Phewa Lake
- Location: Kaski
- Coordinates: 28°12′51″N 83°56′50″E
- Lake type: Freshwater
- Primary inflows: Harpan, Adheri khola & Phirke Khola
- Catchment area: 122.53 km^{2} (47.31 sq mi)
- Basin countries: Nepal
- Max. length: 4 km (2.5 mi)
- Max. width: 2 km (1.2 mi)
- Surface area: 5.7260 km^{2} (2.2 sq mi)
- Average depth: 8.6 m (28 ft)
- Max. depth: 24 m (79 ft)
- Water volume: 0.046 km^{3} (0.011 cu mi)
- Surface elevation: 742 m (2,434 ft)
- Frozen: Does not freeze
- Islands: Tal Barahi (तालबाराही), Temple
- Settlements: Pokhara, Sarangkot, Kaskikot, Dhikurpokhari

Phewa Lake or Phewa Tal (Nepali: फेवा ताल, [ˈpʰewa tal]) is a freshwater lake in Nepal formerly called Baidam Tal located in the south of the Pokhara Valley that includes Pokhara city and parts of Sarangkot and Kaskikot. It is the third largest lake in Nepal and the largest in Gandaki Province after the Phoksundo lake in comparison to Nepal's water bodies. It is the most popular and most visited lake in Nepal. Phewa lake is located at an altitude of 742 m (2,434 ft) and covers an area of about 5.7 km^{2} (2.2 sq mi). It has an average depth of about 8.6 m (28 ft) and a maximum depth of 24 m (79 ft). The maximum water capacity of the lake is approximately 43,000,000 cubic metres (35,000 acre⋅ft). The Annapurna range on the north is only about 28 km (linear distance) away from the lake. The lake is also famous for the reflection of Mount Machhapuchhre and other mountain peaks of the Annapurna and Dhaulagiri ranges on its surface. The Tal Barahi Temple is situated on an island in the lake. It is located 4 km from the city's centre Chipledhunga.

== Origin ==
An analysis of lake sediments reveals its age to be BC 12640 - 12025. However, Phewa lake is regarded to have been formed circa 13000 BC.

== Lake economy ==
Phewa lake and water sports is one of the major tourist attractions of Pokhara city and the north shore of the lake has developed into a tourist district, commonly called Lakeside, with hotels, restaurants and bars catering to the tourists. The water from Phewa lake's outlet is used to generate electricity. The Phewa Power House is located about 1.5 km (0.93 mi) from the southern part of the Phewa lake. A part of the lake is also used for commercial caged fisheries.

== Major attraction ==
- Tal Barahi Temple, located at the center of Phewa Lake, is the most important religious monument of Pokhara. This two-storied pagoda is believed to be dedicated to one of the Hindu gods known as Vishnu. It usually gets crowded on Saturdays.
- Baidam is the eastern bank of Phewa lake also known as Lakeside. This part contains seemingly endless strip of hotels, lodges, restaurants, bookshops and souvenir shops. This site is one of the best-known tourist areas of Nepal. It is also the starting point of the tour to Pokhara.
- Sarangkot and paragliding, Sarangkot is the only place in Nepal for paragliding, from where you can fly over the Phewa lake.
- Ratna Mandir, a former palace used by the Nepalese royal family.

== Gallery ==
Aerial view of Fewa Lake and lake Side Street,Pokhara

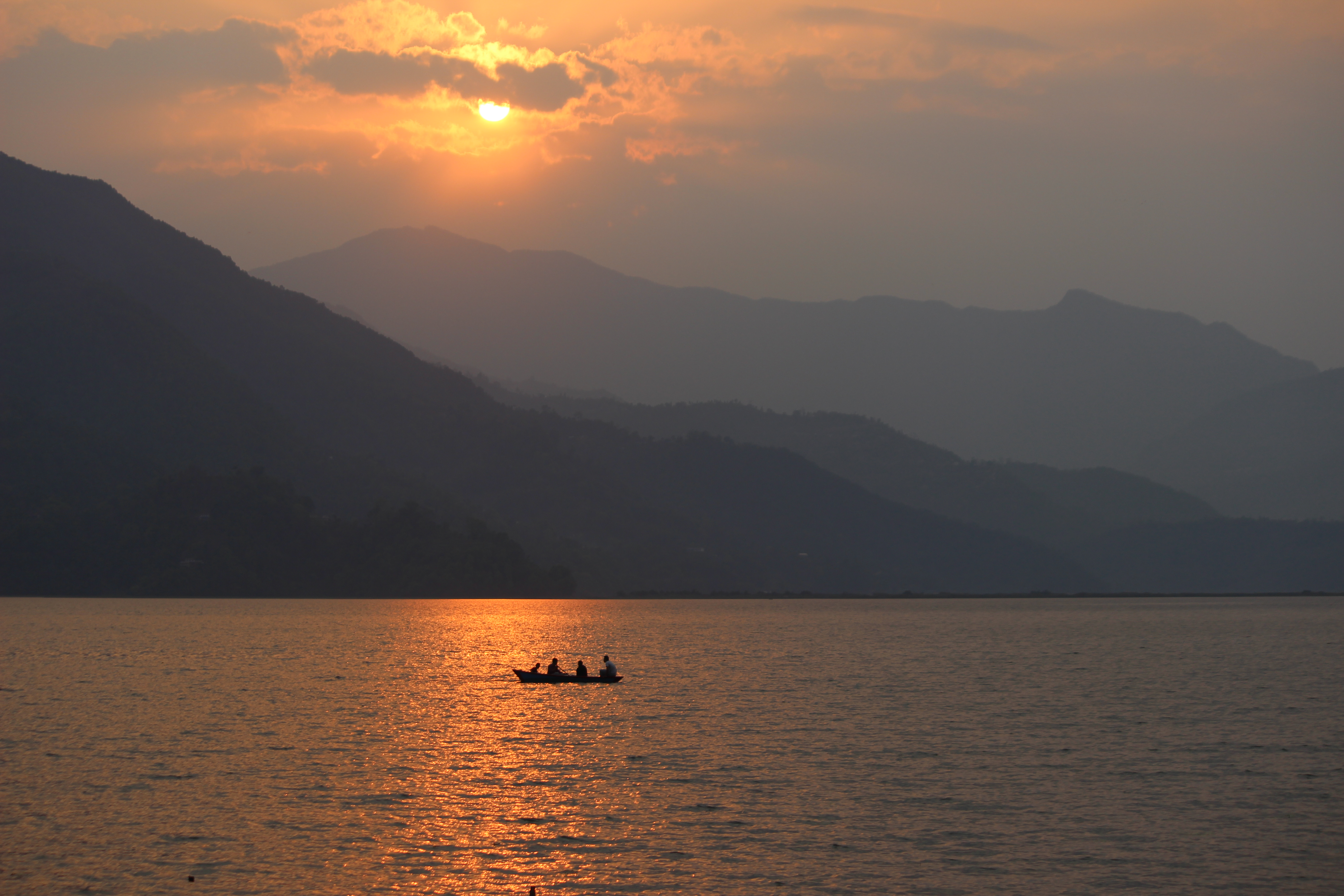
Sunset in Phewa lake

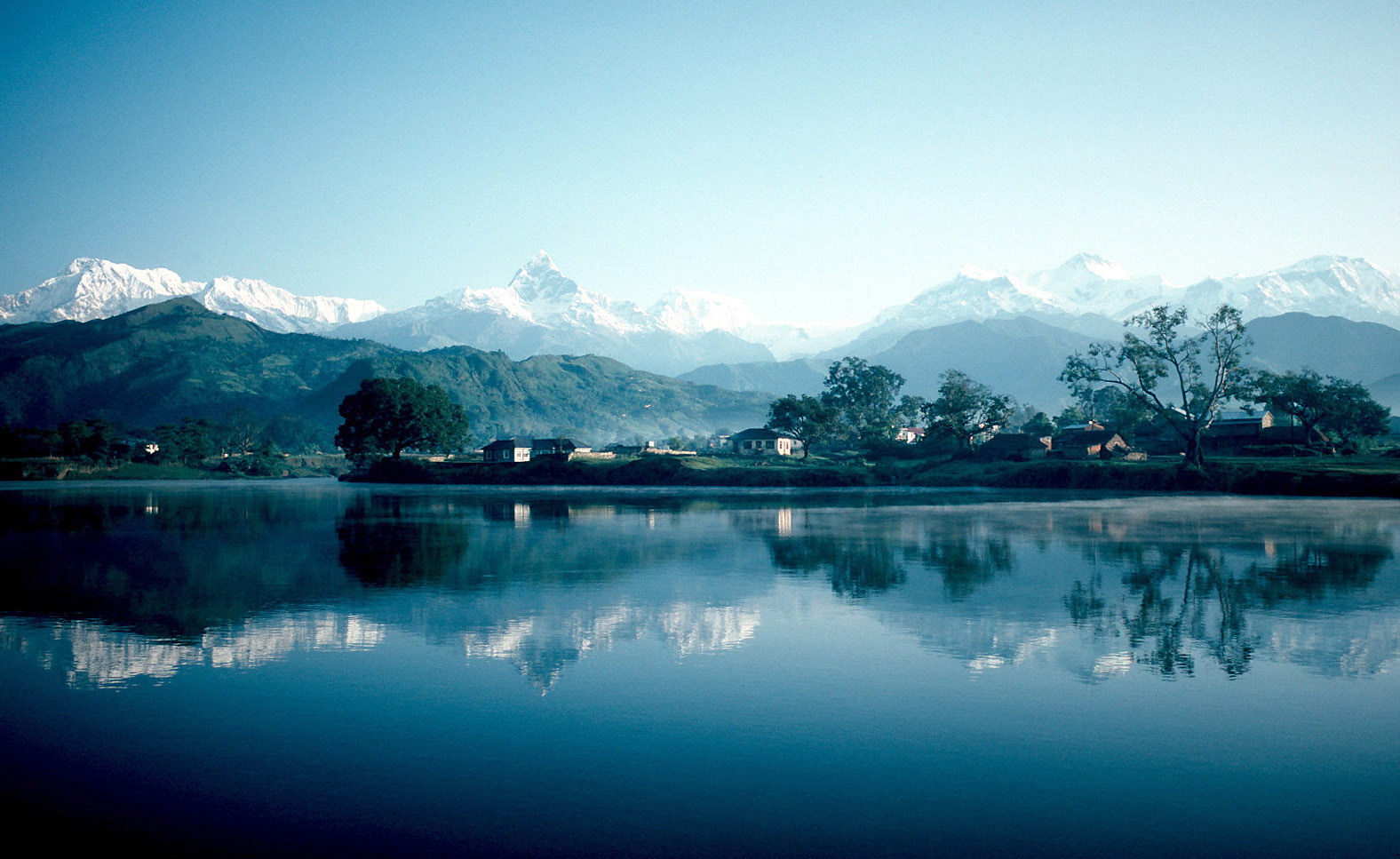
Reflection of Annapurna range in the lake

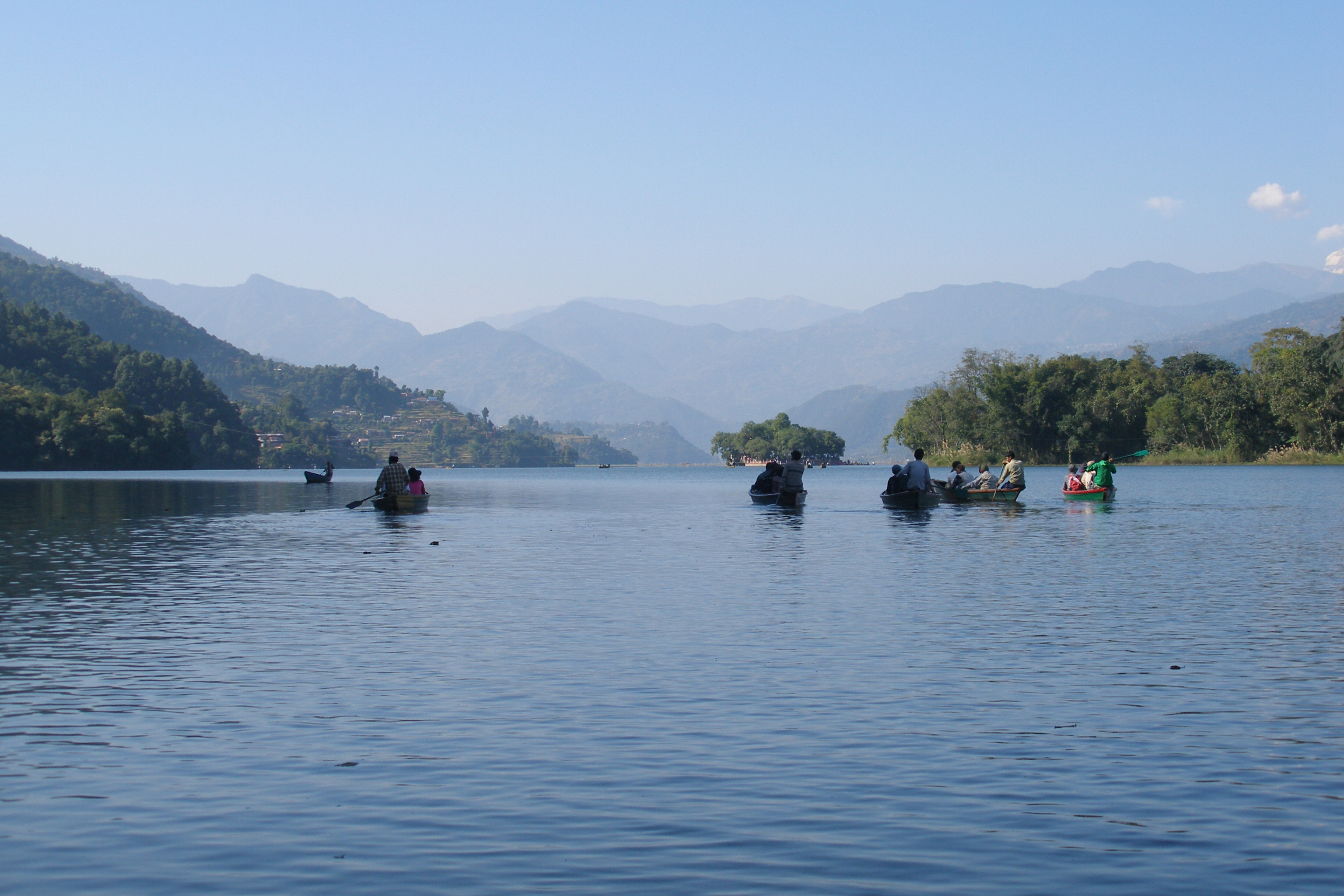
Hills around the lake

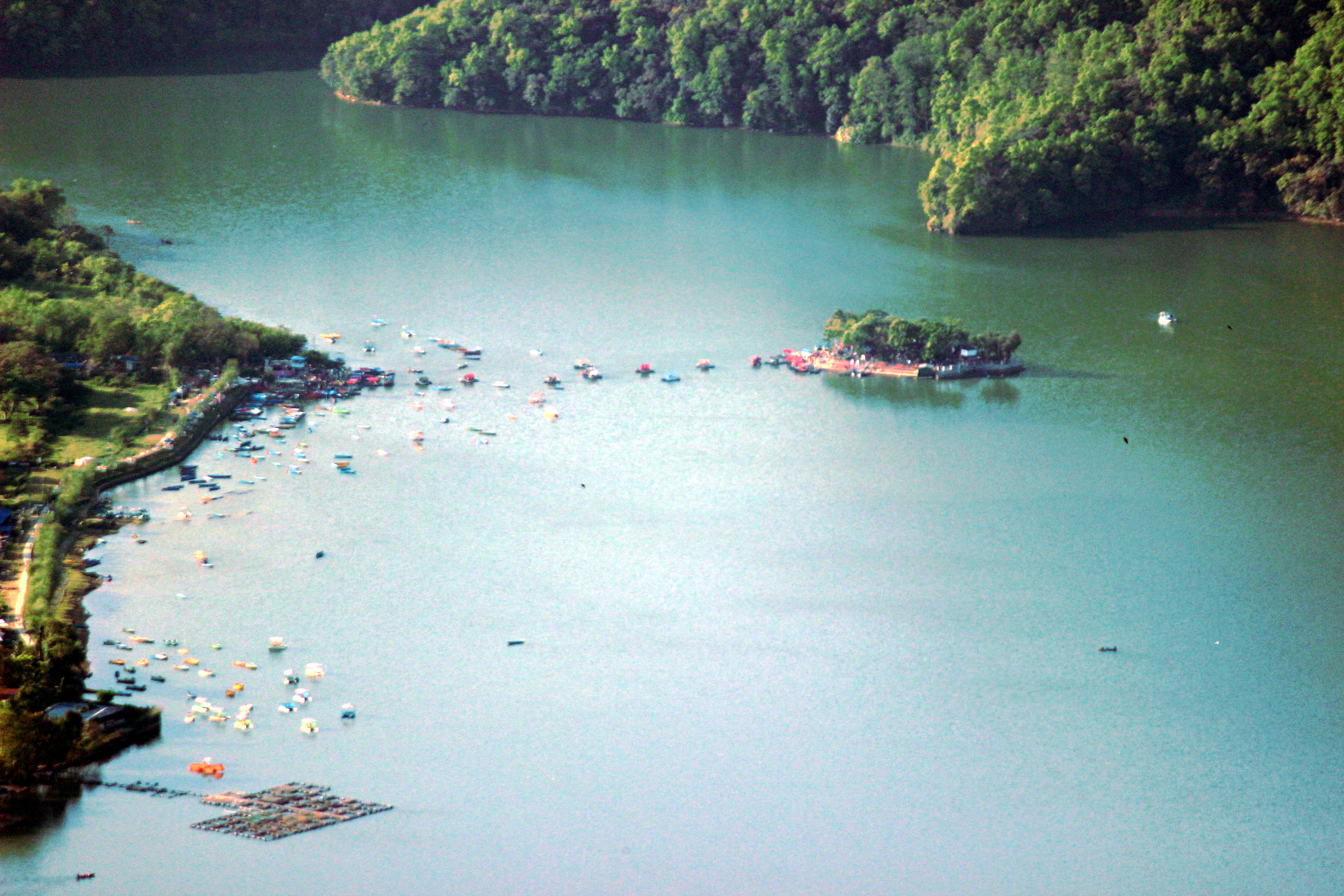
Aerial view of the lake with Tal Barahi Temple

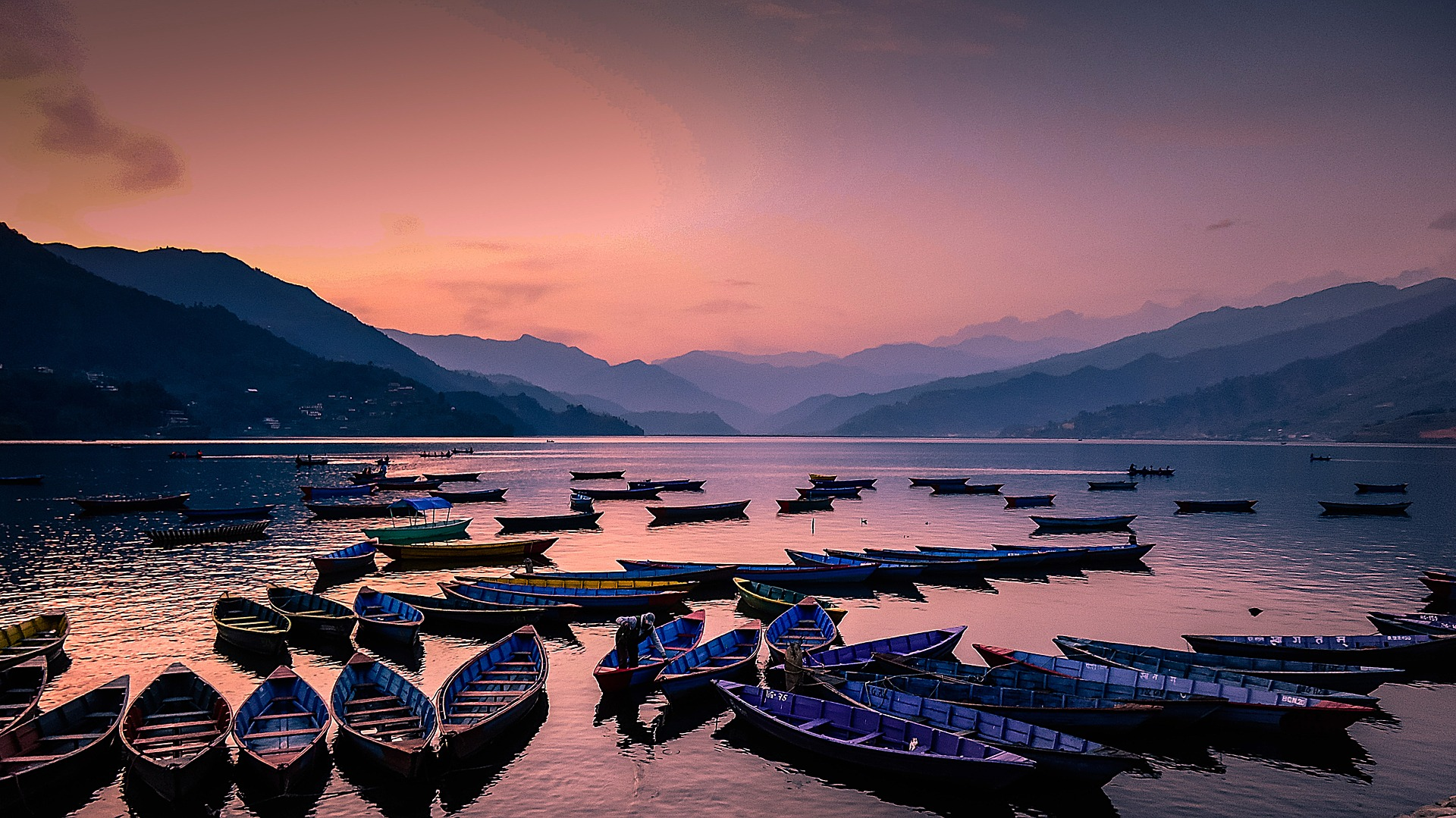
Golden hour at the lake

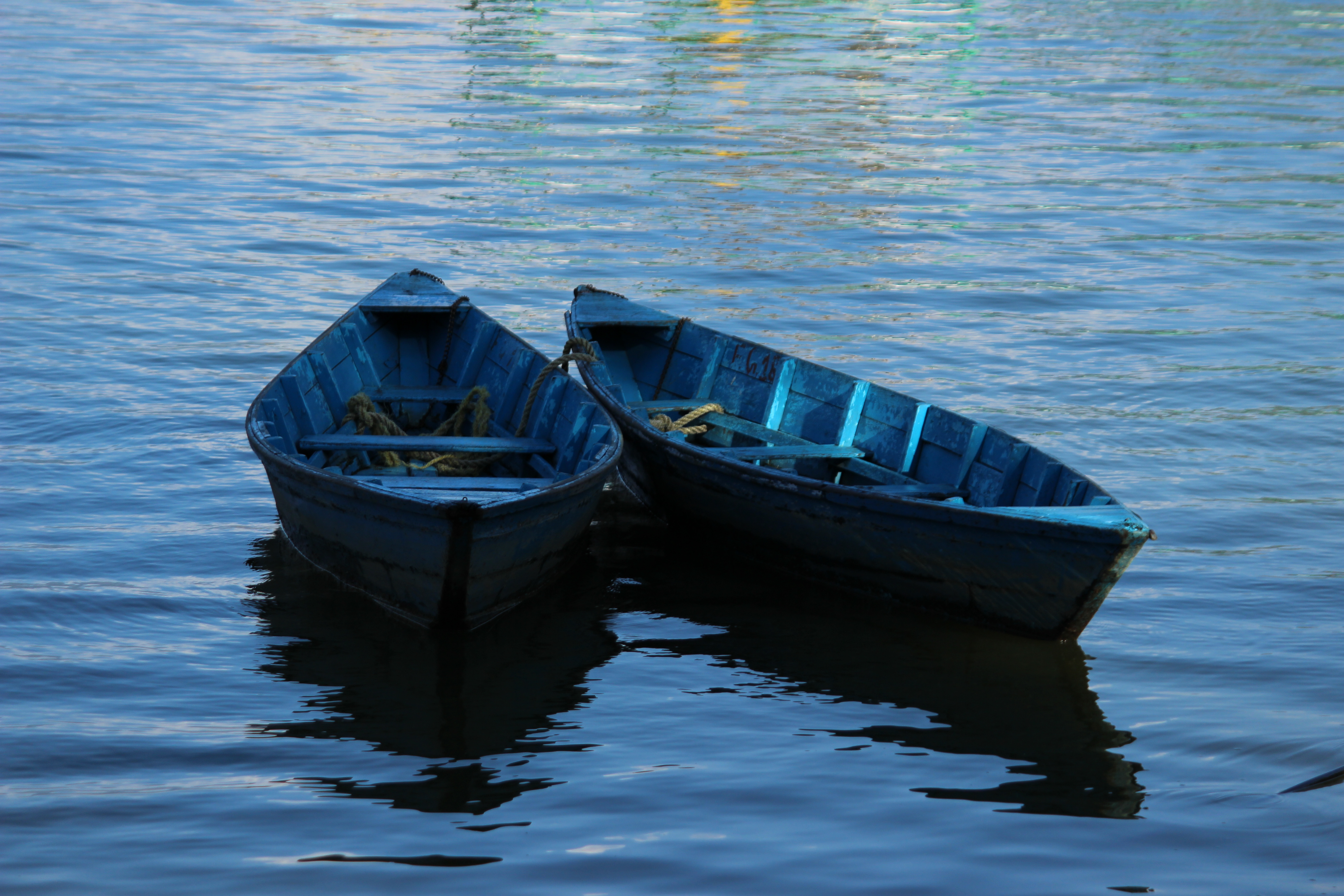
Canoes in Phewa Lake

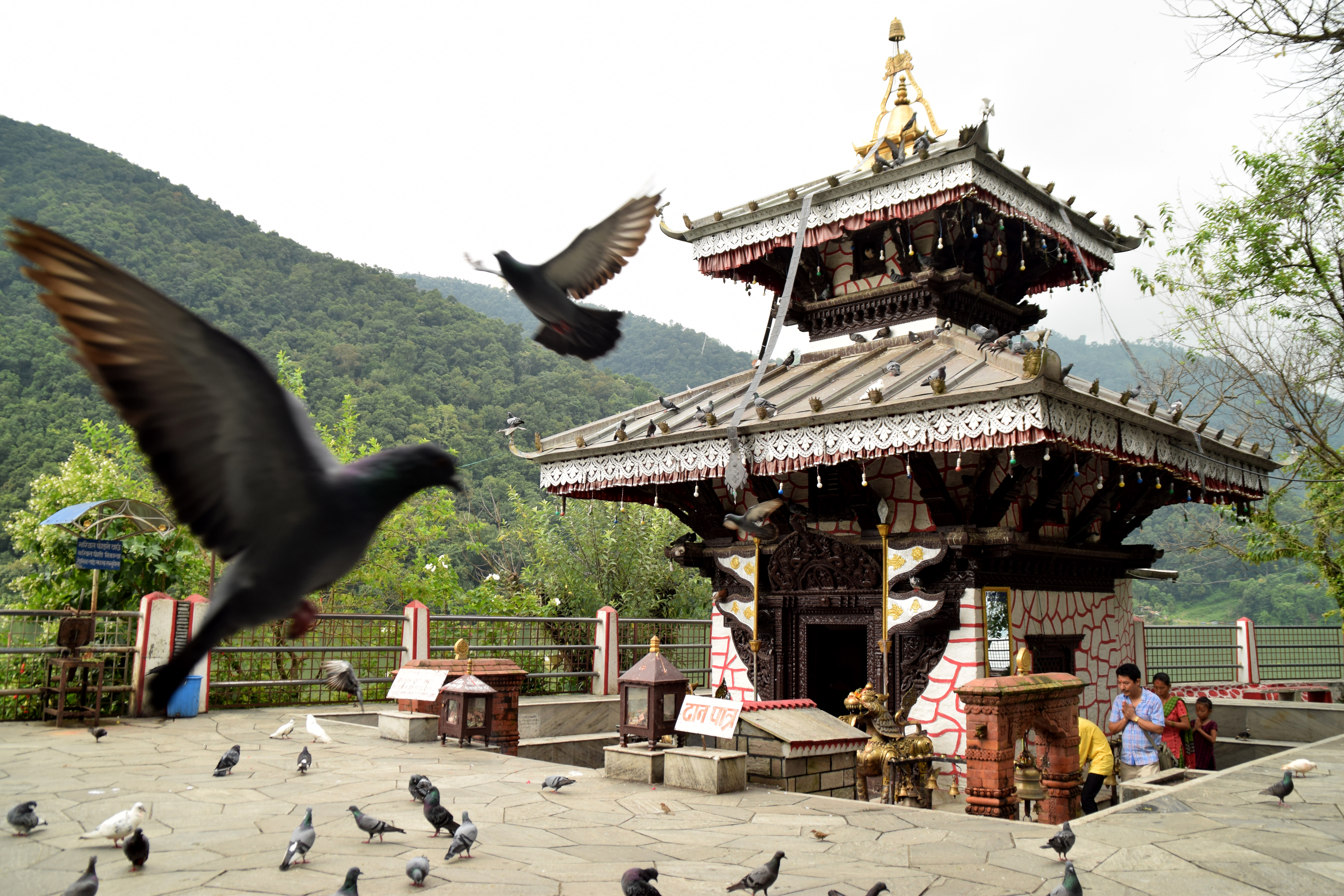
Tal Barahi temple

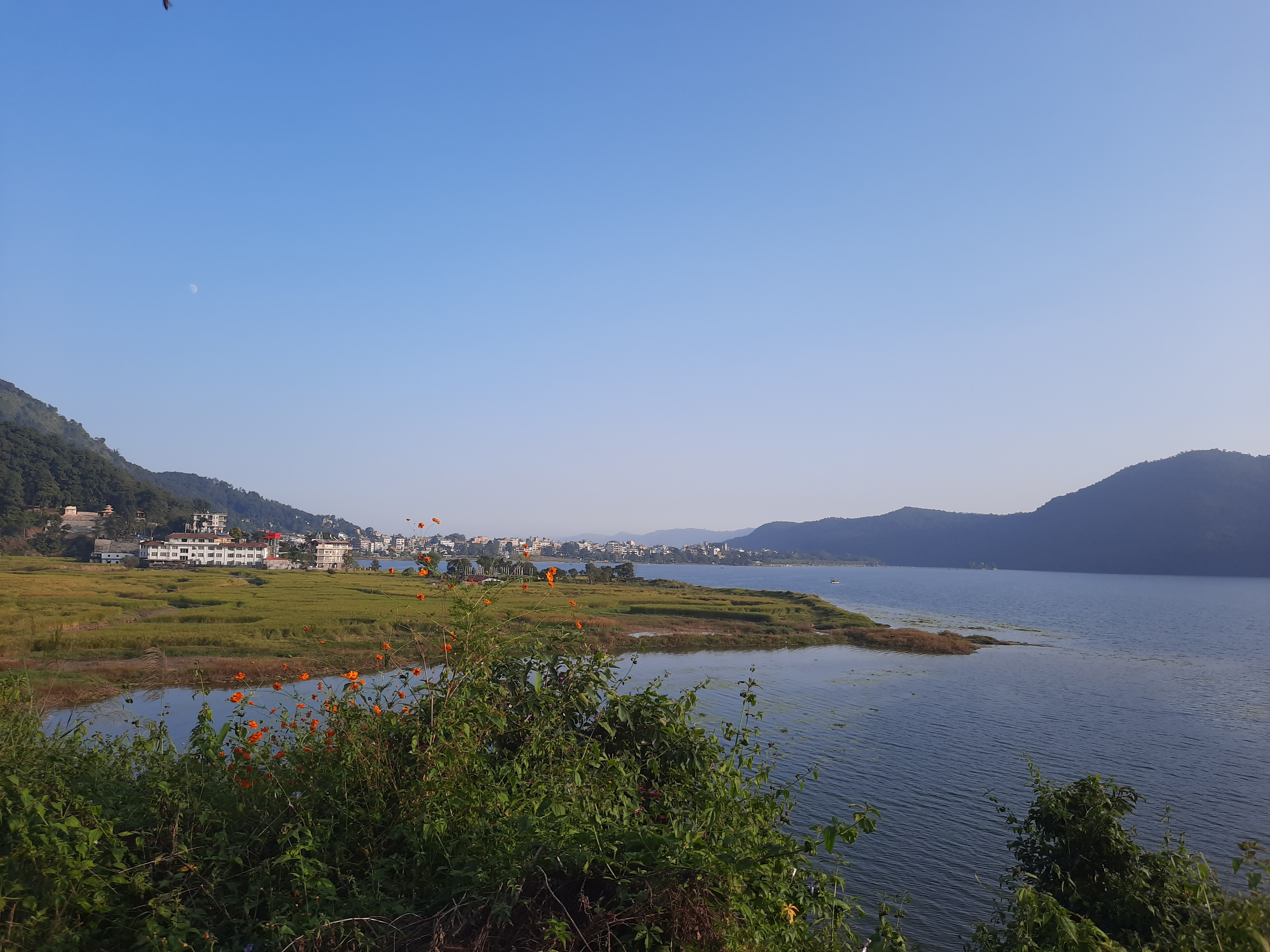
Fewa Lake from Ratmate Danda

== See also ==
- Annapurna
- Dhaulagiri
- Begnas Lake
- Rara Lake
- List of Nepal-related topics
