= Tal Barahi Temple =

Hindu temple in Pokhara, Nepal

Barahi Temple
- बराहि मन्दिर
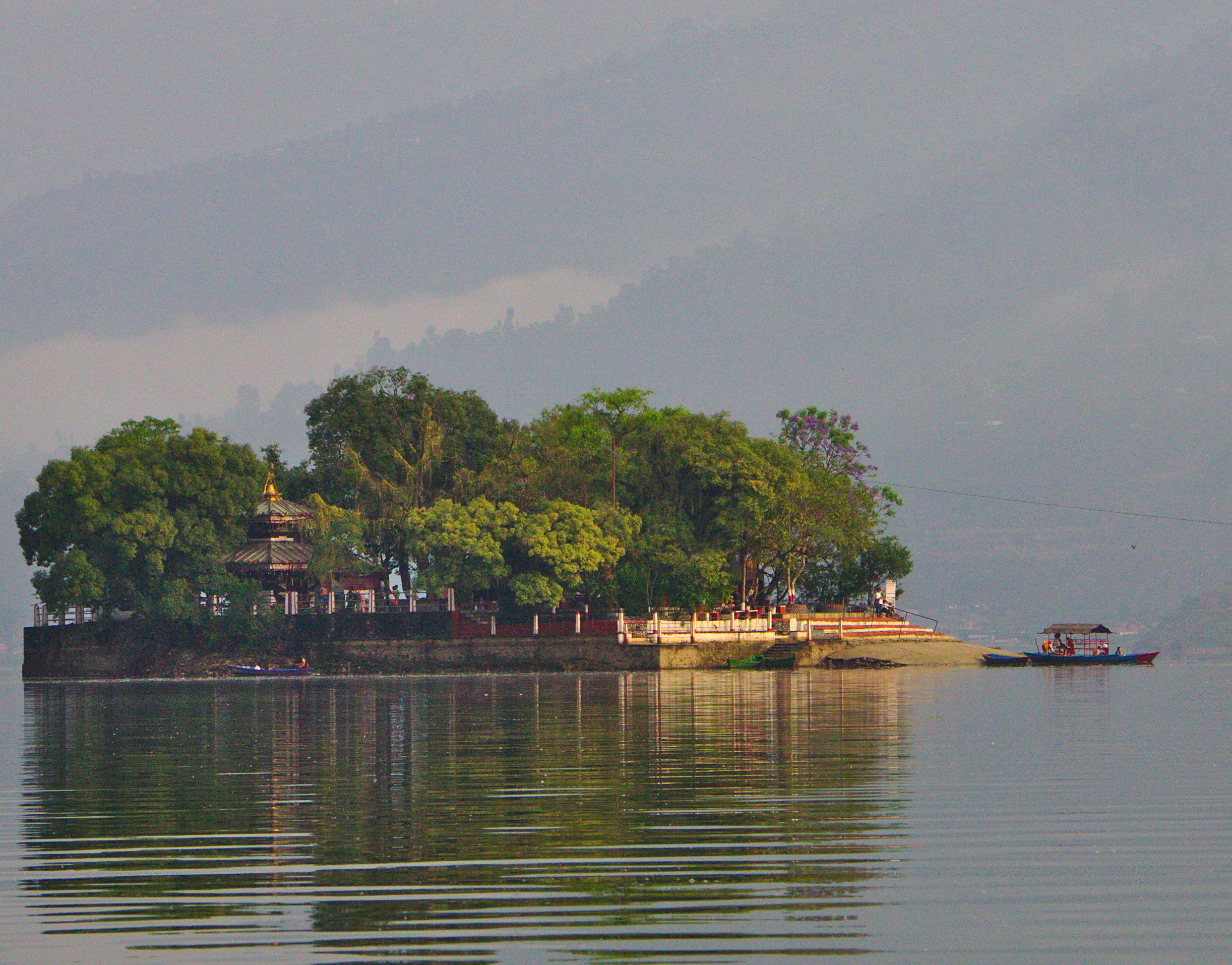

- Location in Nepal

Religion
- Affiliation: Hinduism
- District: Gandaki Province
- Deity: Barahi
- Festival: Dashain

Location
- Country: Nepal
- Interactive map of Barahi Temple
- Coordinates: 27.8697108°N 83.9513°E

Tal Barahi temple (Nepali: तालबाराही मन्दिर) also known as ‘Lake Temple’ or ‘Barahi Temple’ is a Hindu temple of the goddess Barahi. It is the most important religious monument in Pokhara, Nepal. This temple is located on a small island in the middle of Phewa Lake. As the temple is situated on a small island, the only way to visit it is by boat. The temple is a symbol of the manifestation of Ajima representing the female force. Devotees visit the temple in the Nepalese months of Baisakh (April–May) and Kartik (November–December).

== Archaeology ==
The original structure of the temple is made from stones and has a two-story thatched roof in pagoda style.

== Gallery ==
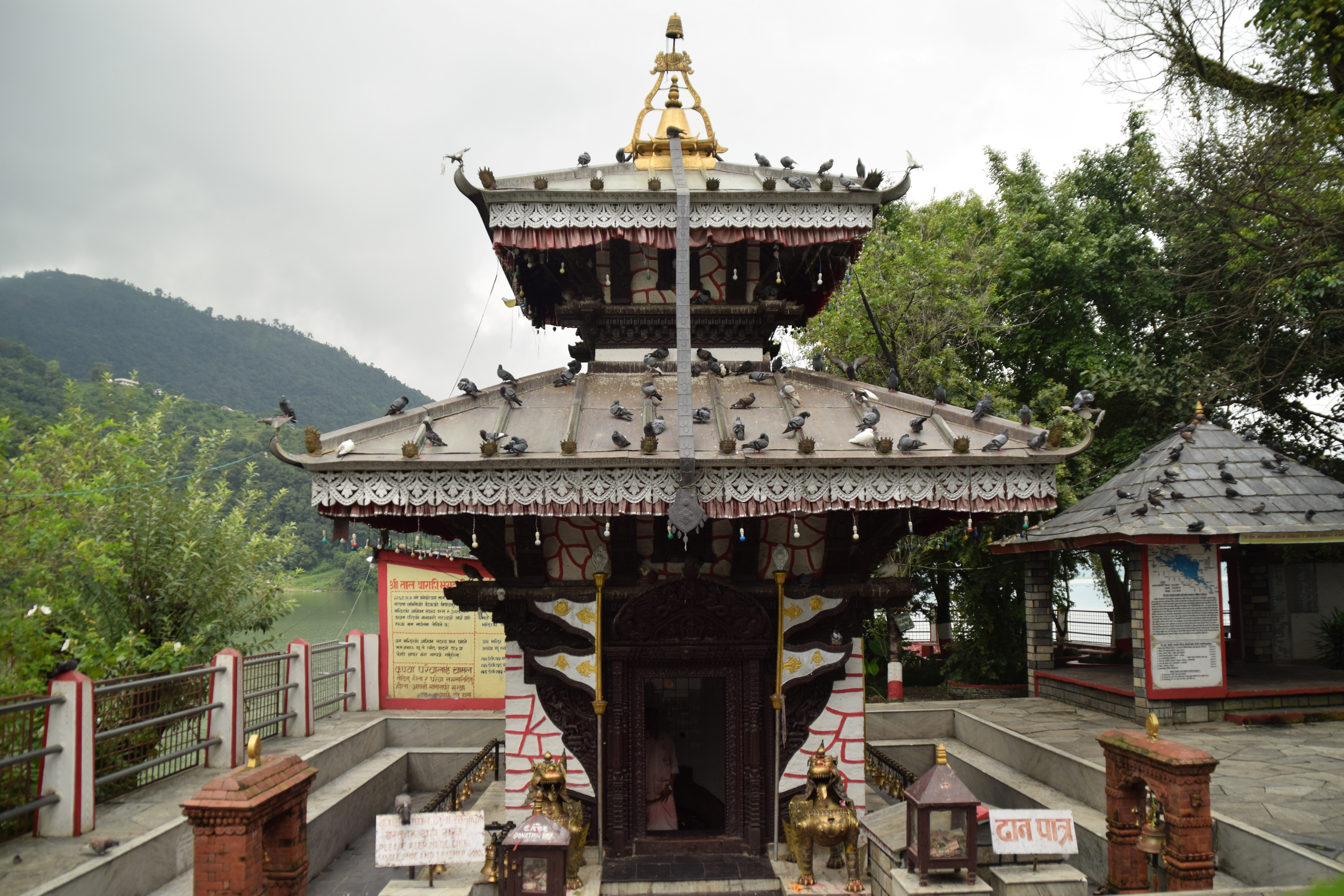
temple

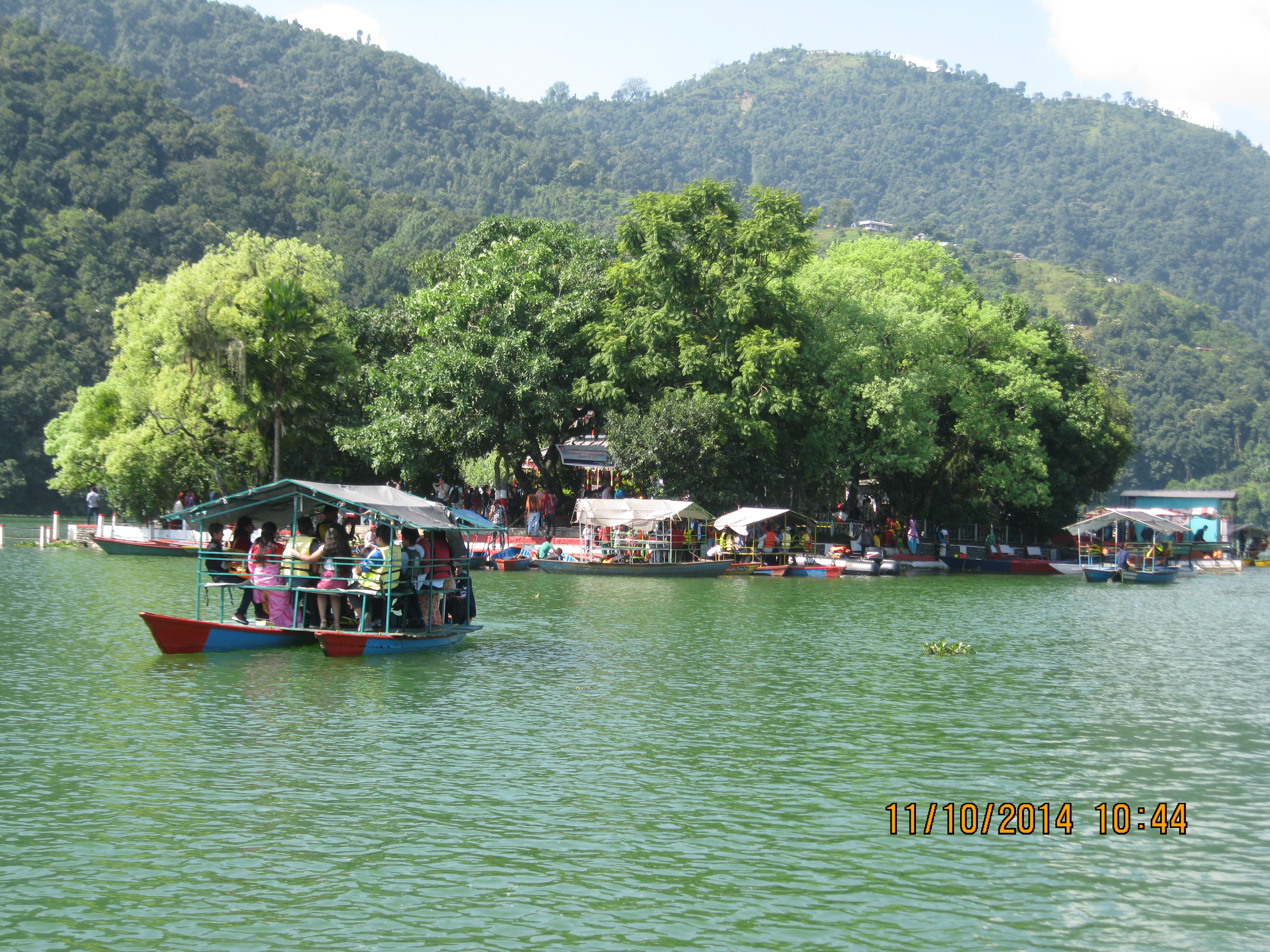
View of temple

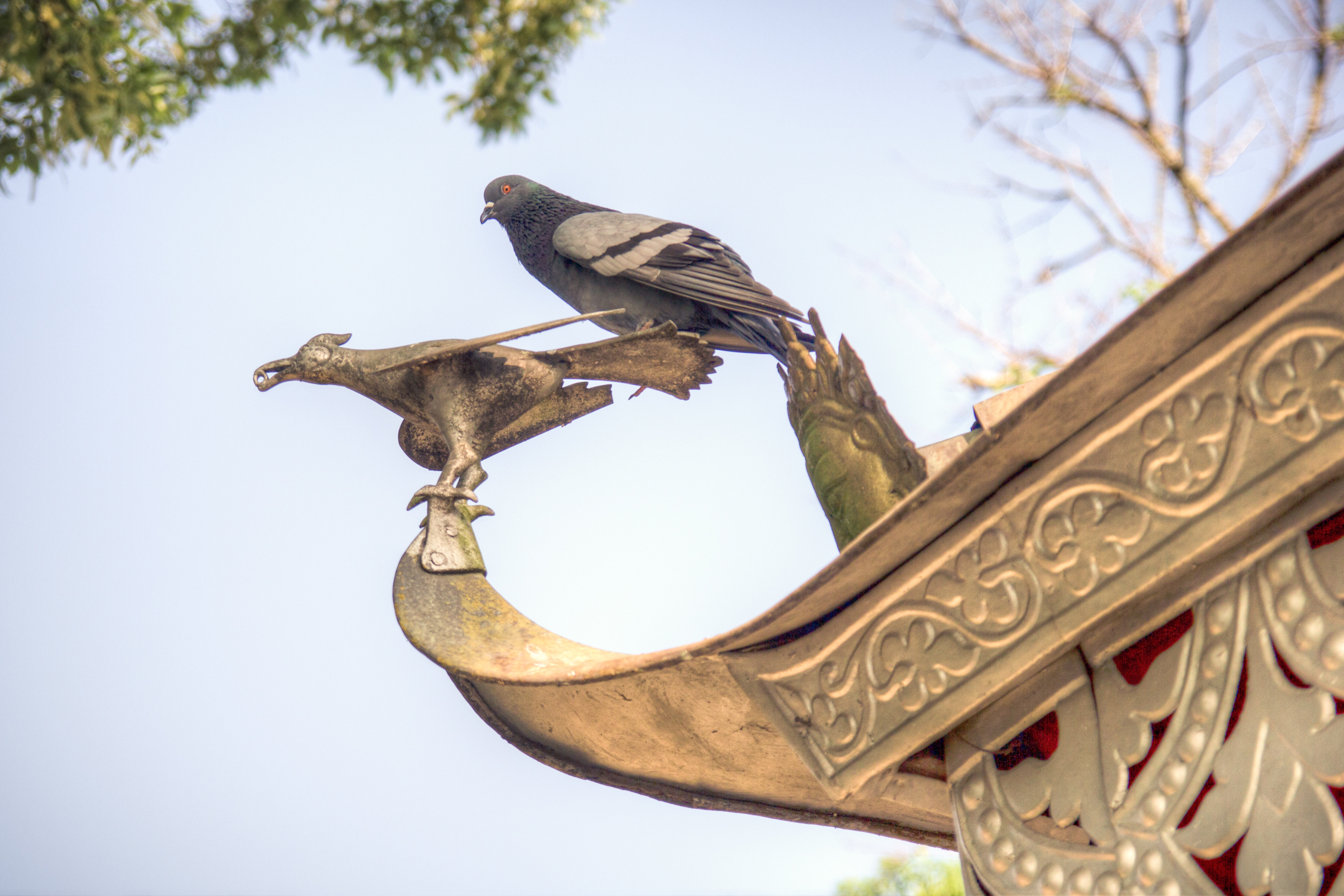
Roof

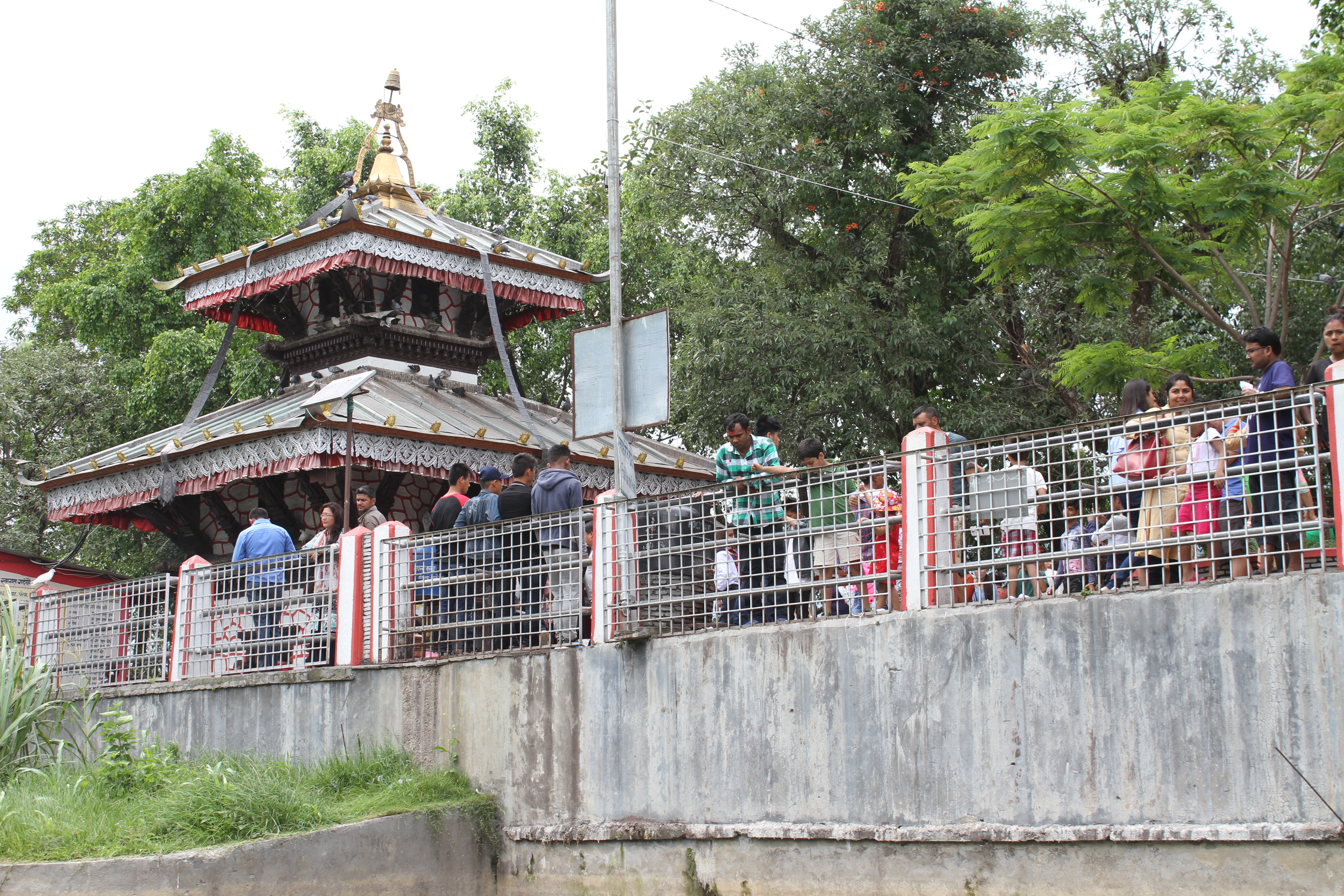
Side view

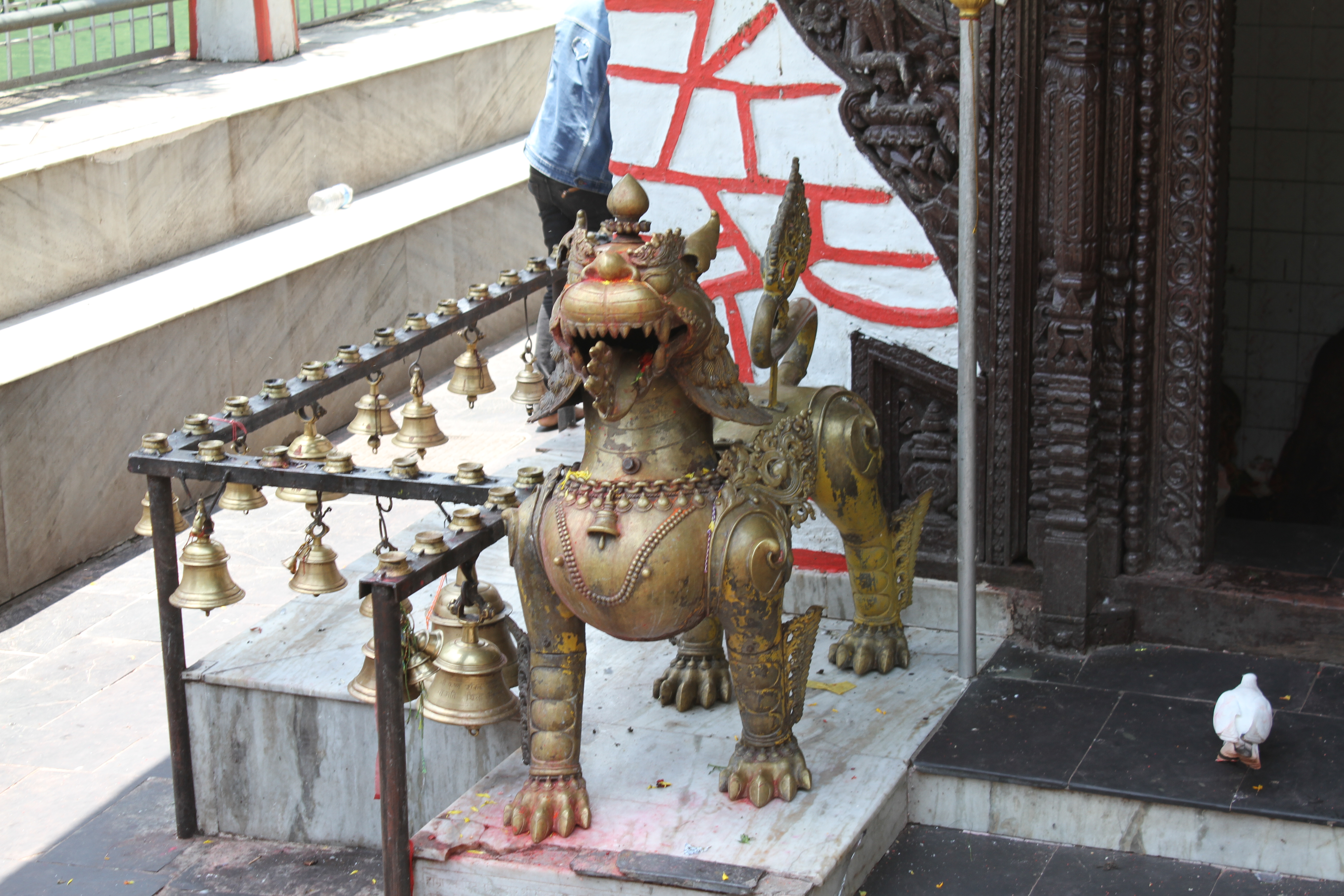
Entry of temple gate

== See also ==
- Bindhyabasini Temple
- Bhadrakali Temple
- List of Hindu temples in Nepal
