= Sarangkot =

Sarangkot सराङकोट
- Subdivision of Pokhara
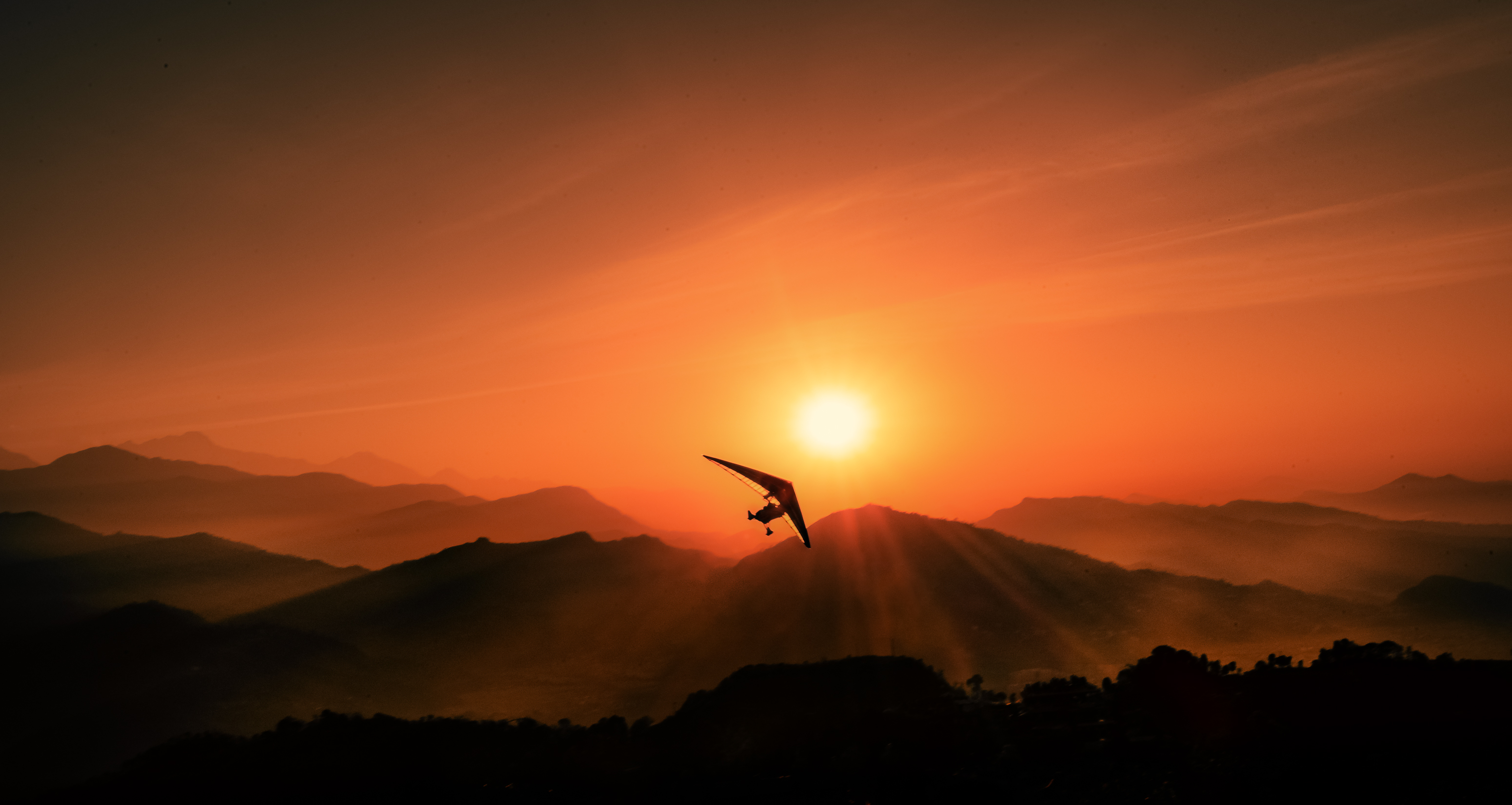
- View from Sarangkot to Annapurna Conservation Area

- Location in Nepal Sarangkot (Nepal)
- Coordinates: 28°14′30″N 83°58′0″E
- Country: Nepal
- Zone: Gandaki Zone
- District: Kaski District
- Area: Pokhara

Population (1991)
  - Total: 5,060
- Time zone: UTC+5:45 (NST)
- Area code: 061

Sarangkot is Ward 18 of Pokhara, Kaski District, Nepal, after it was merged into the city in 2015. It is a popular tourist destination for those who arrive in Pokhara. At the 1991 Nepal census it had a total population of 5,060 with 1,010 individual households.

The Ward is located on Sarangkot, a hill on the western side of Pokhara with an altitude of 1600m. Sarangkot is known for its panoramic Himalayan views of Dhaulagiri, Annapurna and Manaslu. It also provides an expansive view of the city of Pokhara, from the extreme north to the south including Phewa Lake. Tourists drive up the hill to watch the sunrise from the view tower at the top. In recent years, Sarangkot has been called one of the best paragliding locations in the world. The hike up from the Pokhara Baglung highway at Miruwa to Sarangkot takes 90 minutes.

== Gallery ==
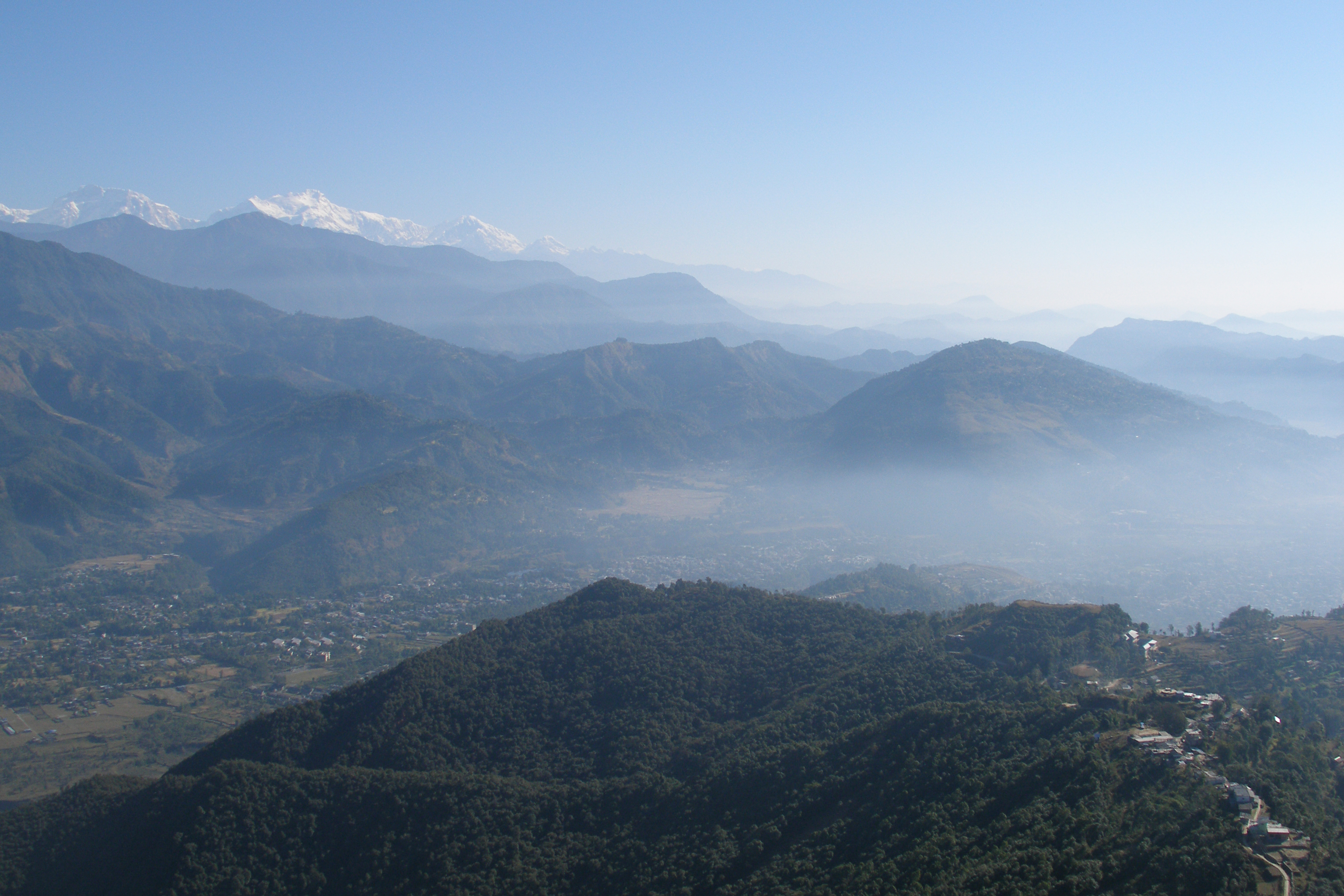
View from Sarangkot

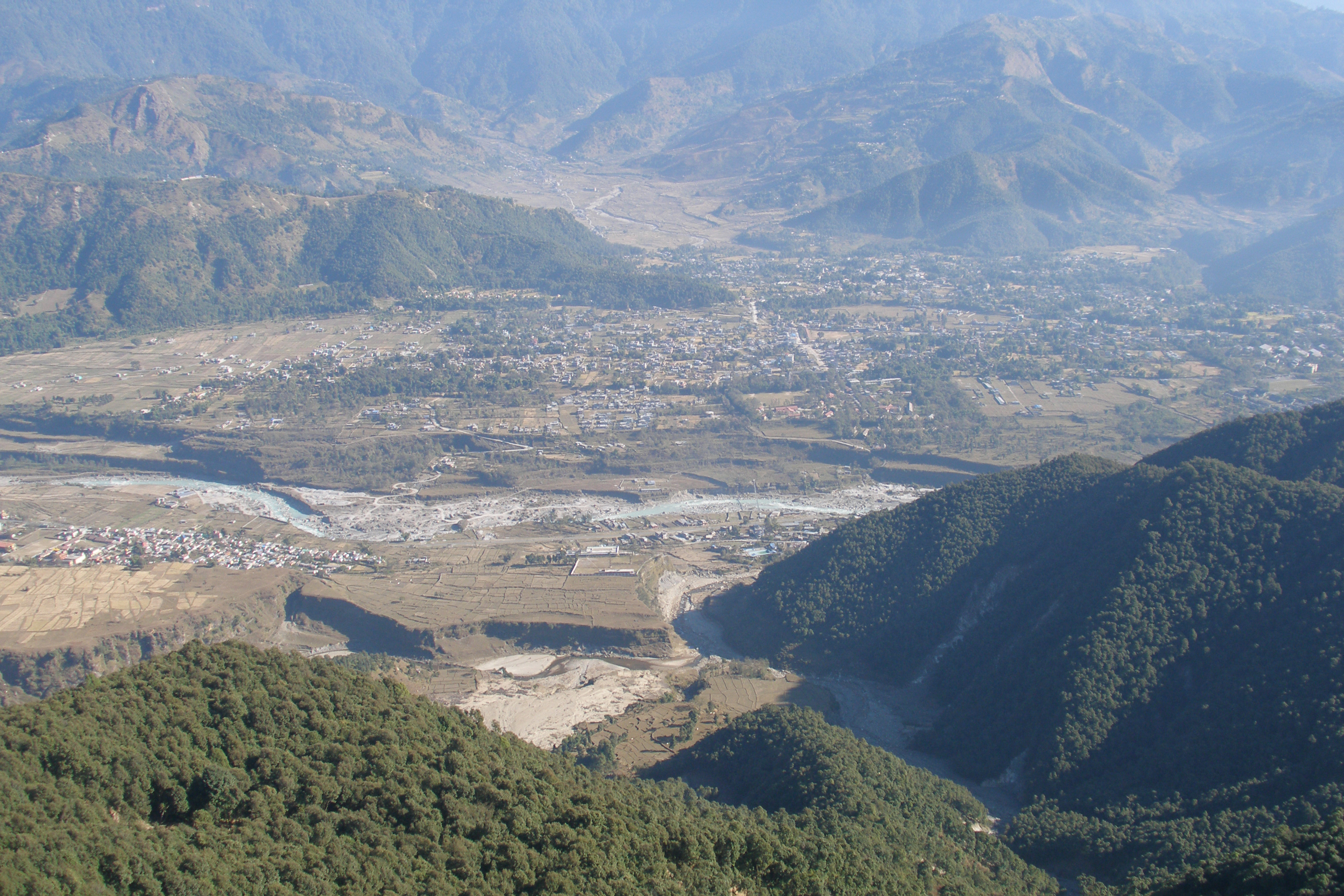
View from Sarangkot

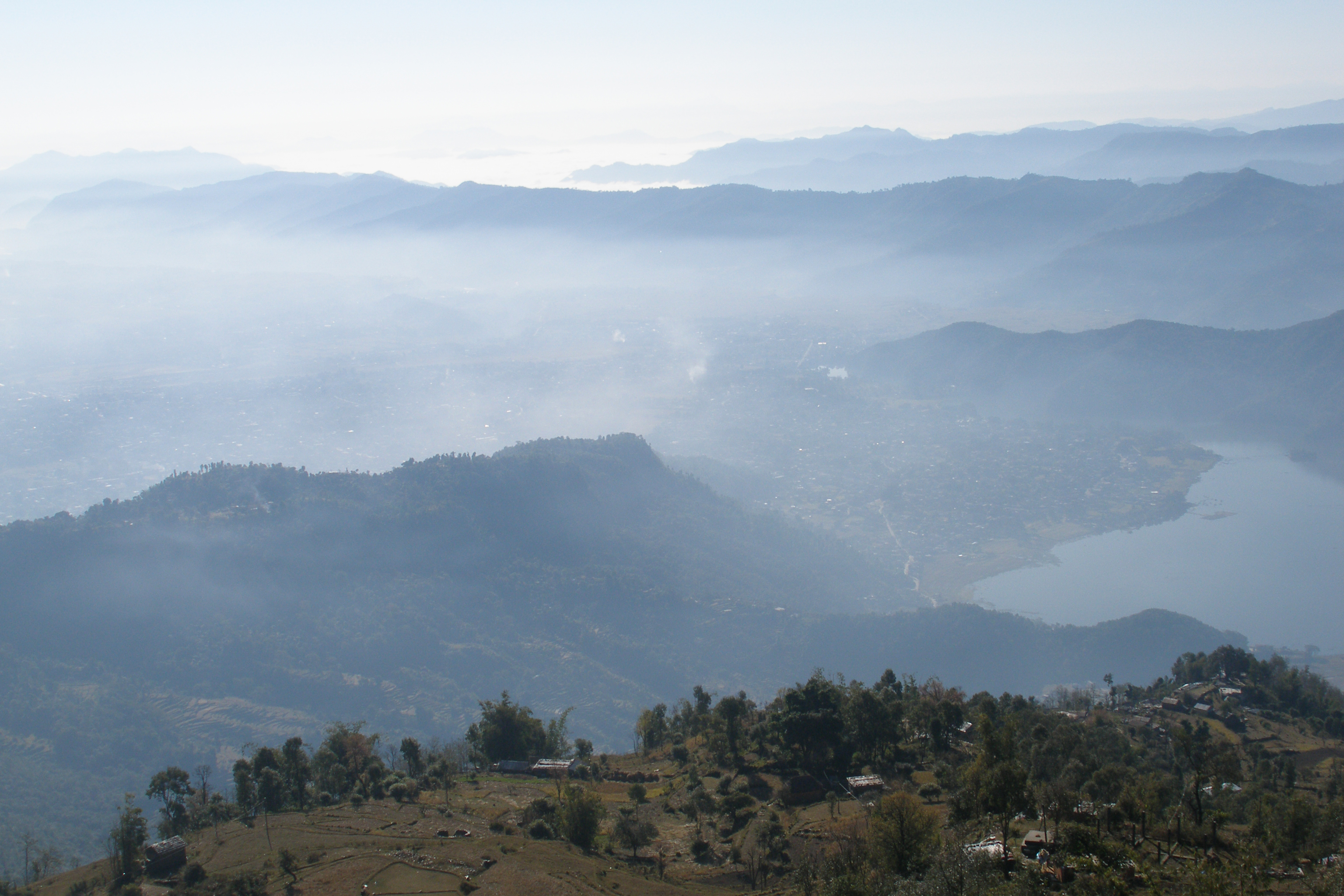
Pokhara Lake from Sarangkot

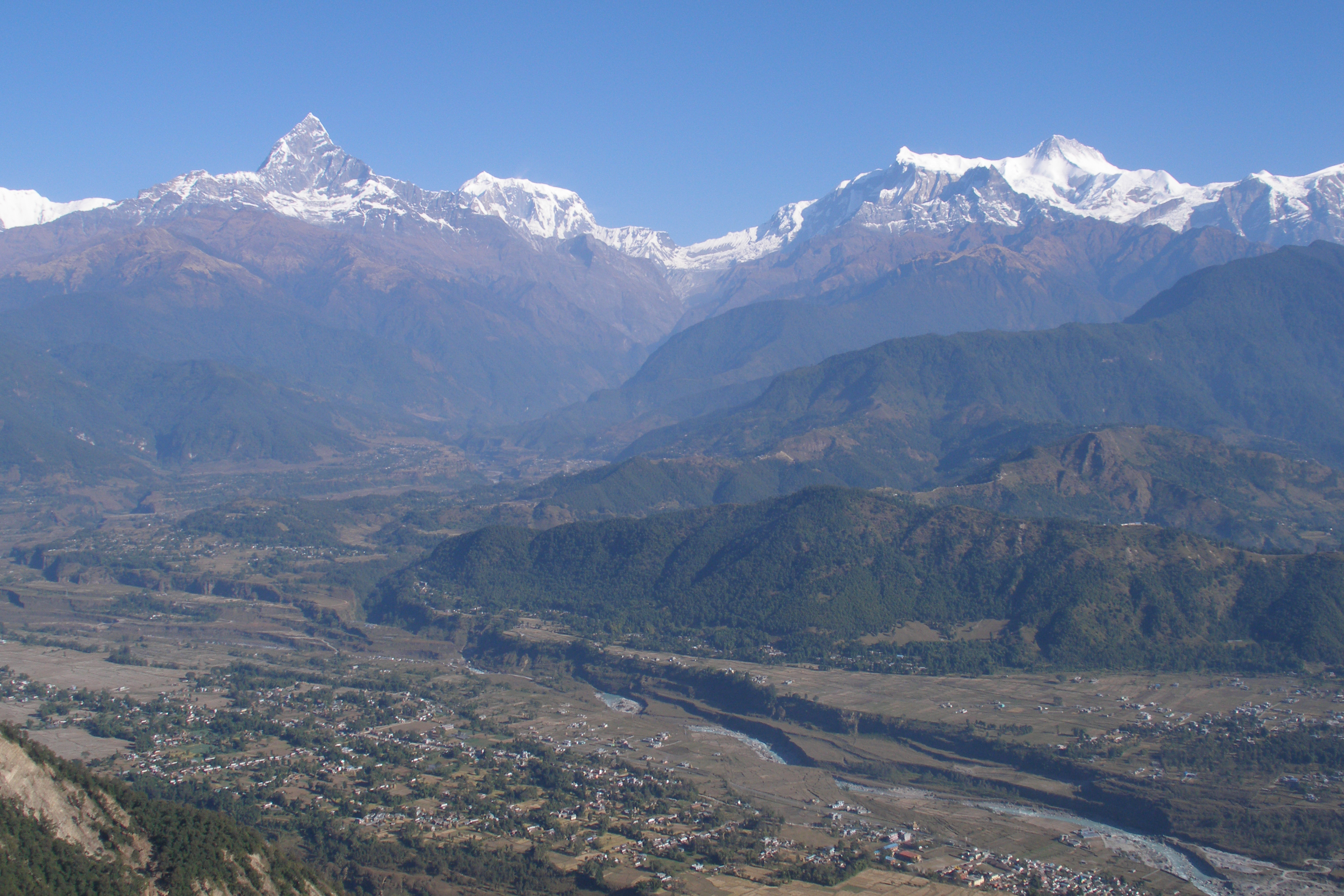
Annapurna Himal from Sarangkot

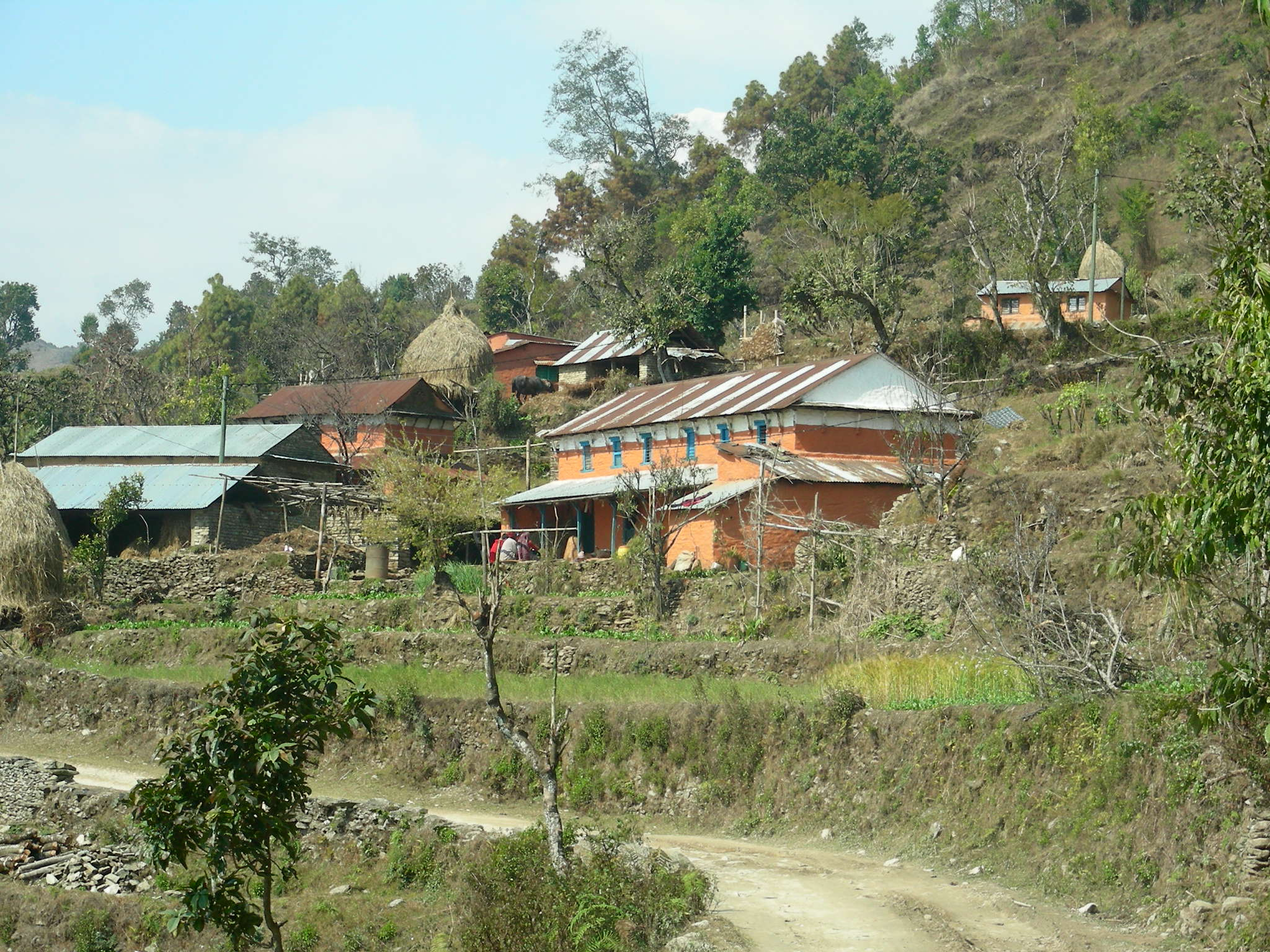

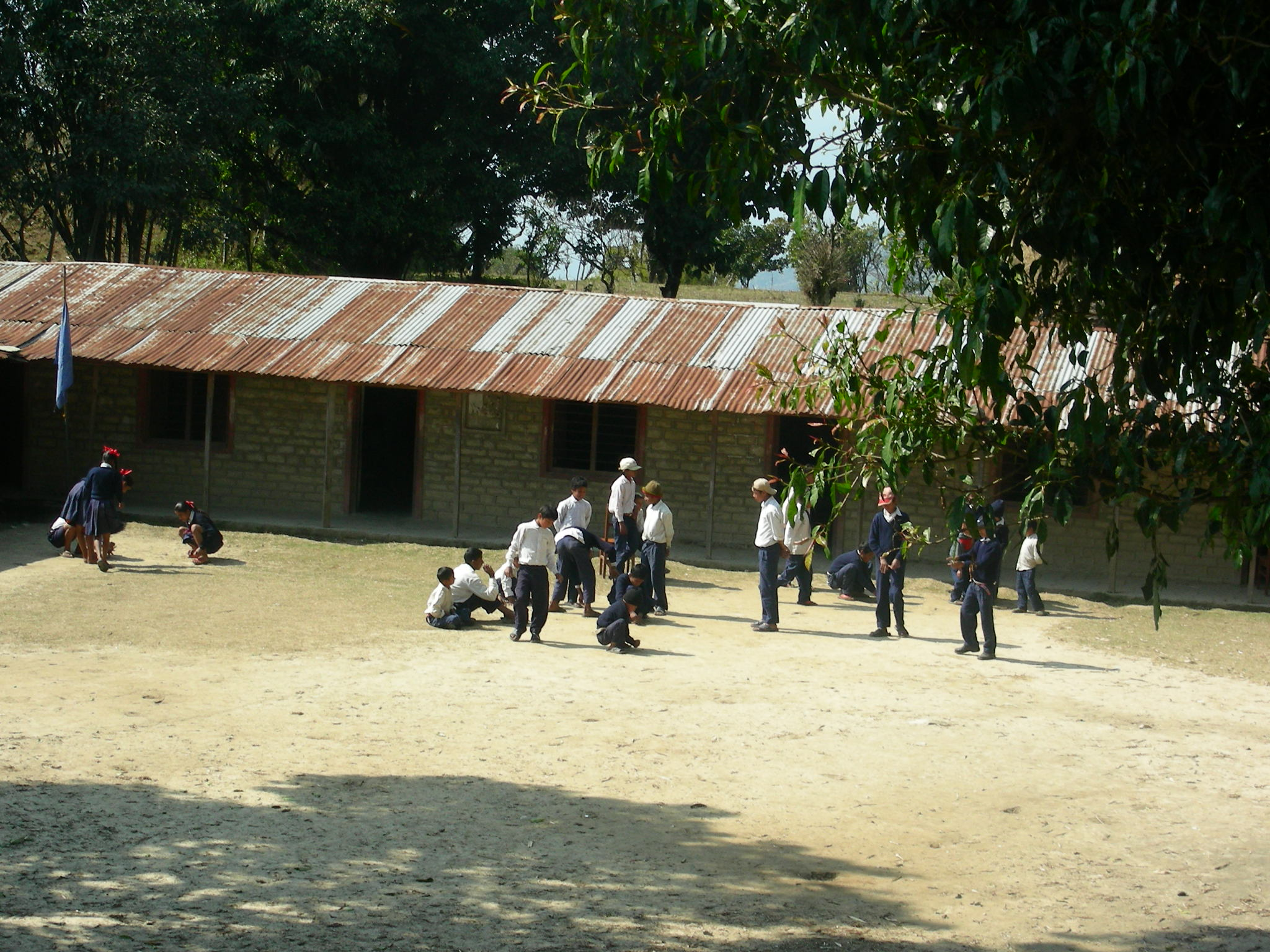
Sarankot school

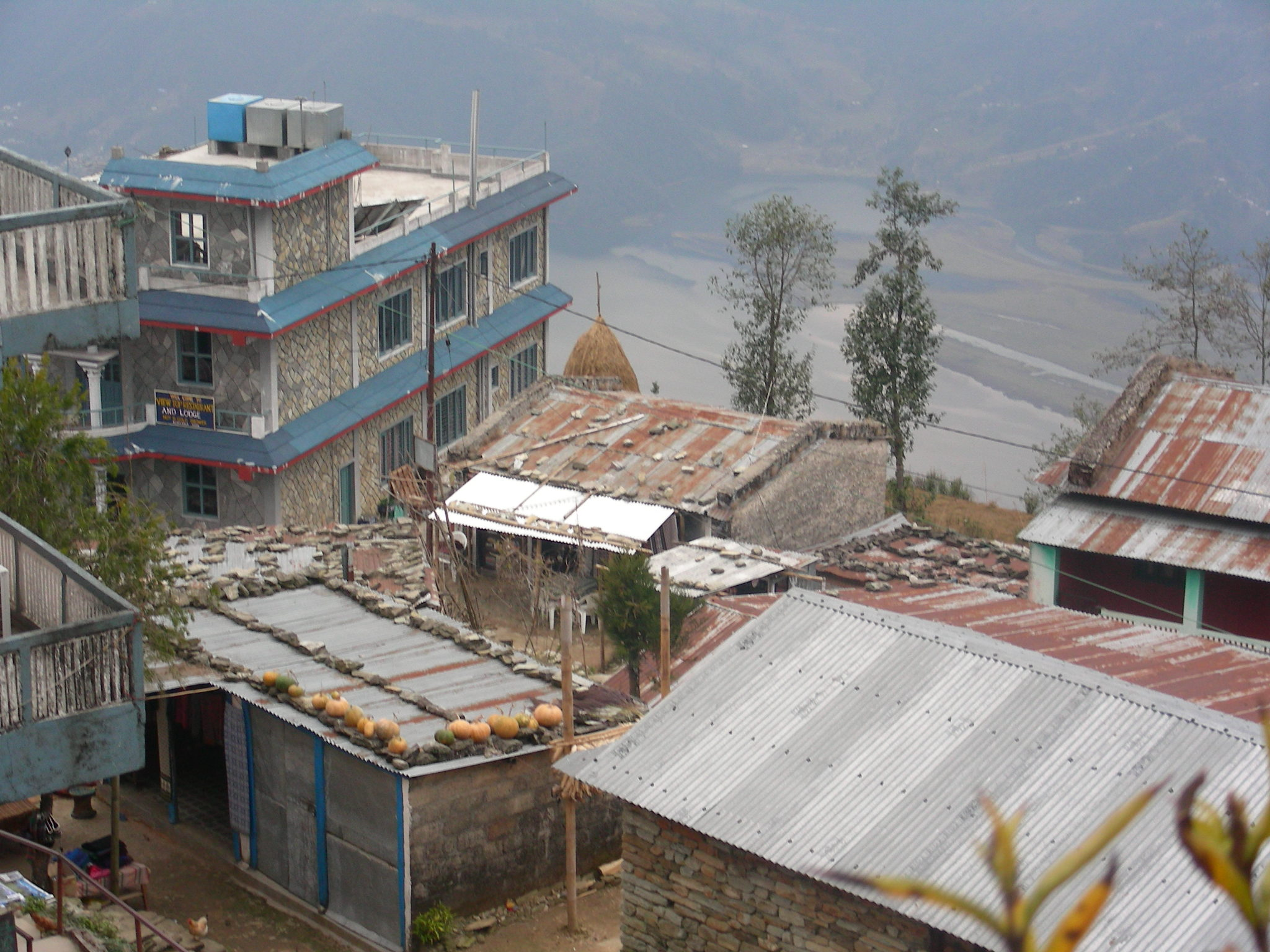

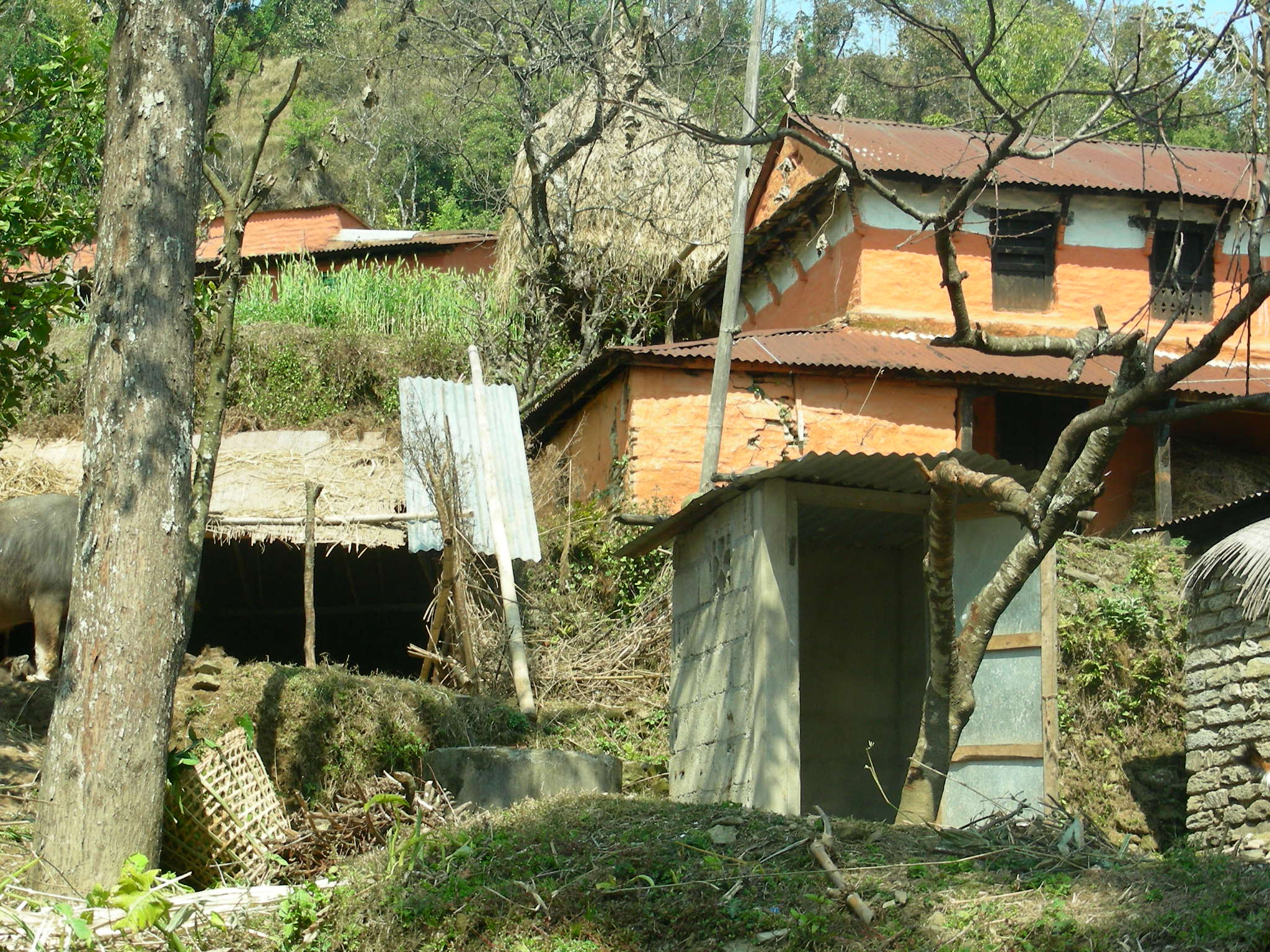
Sarankot village

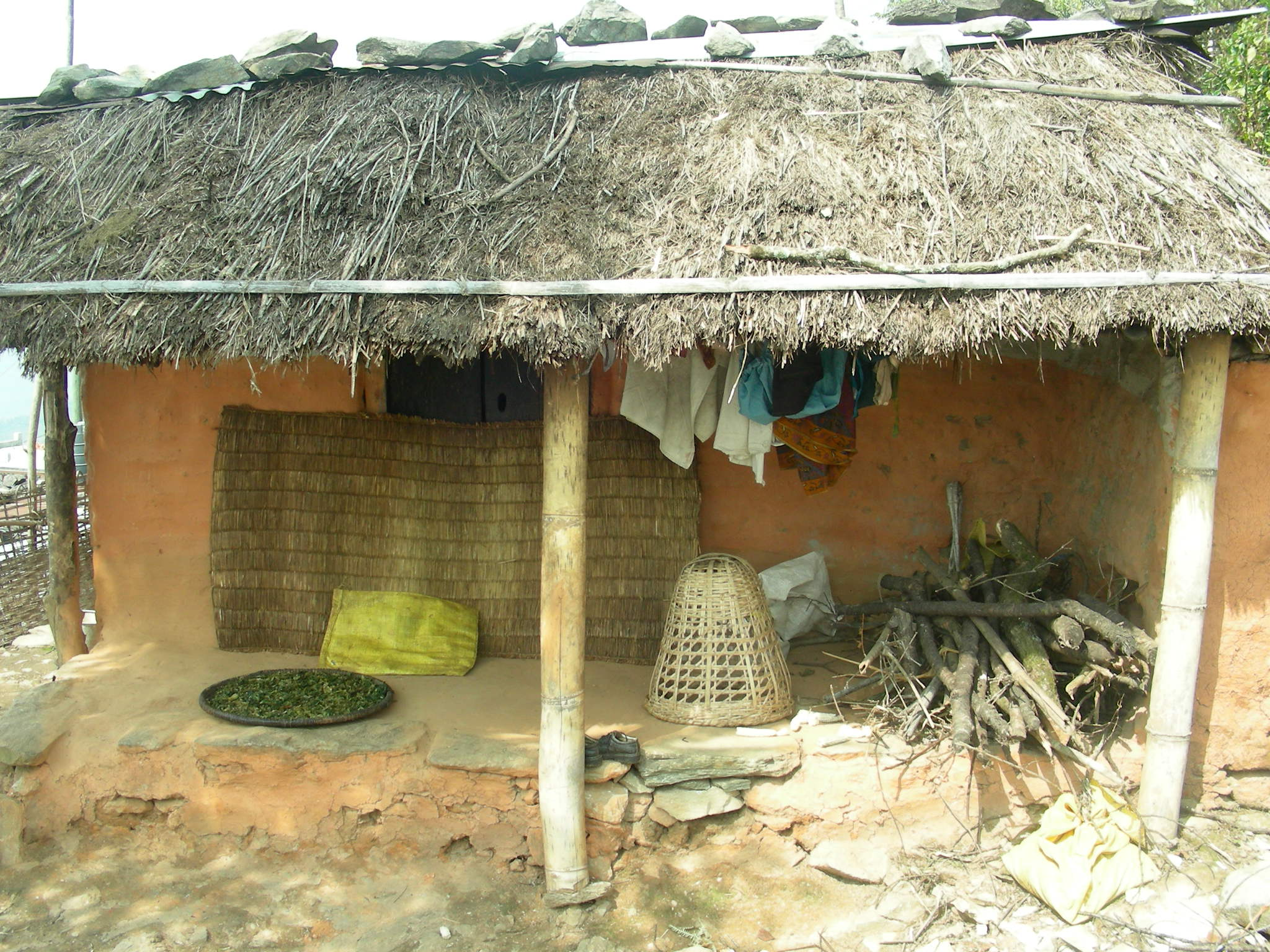
Traditional houses

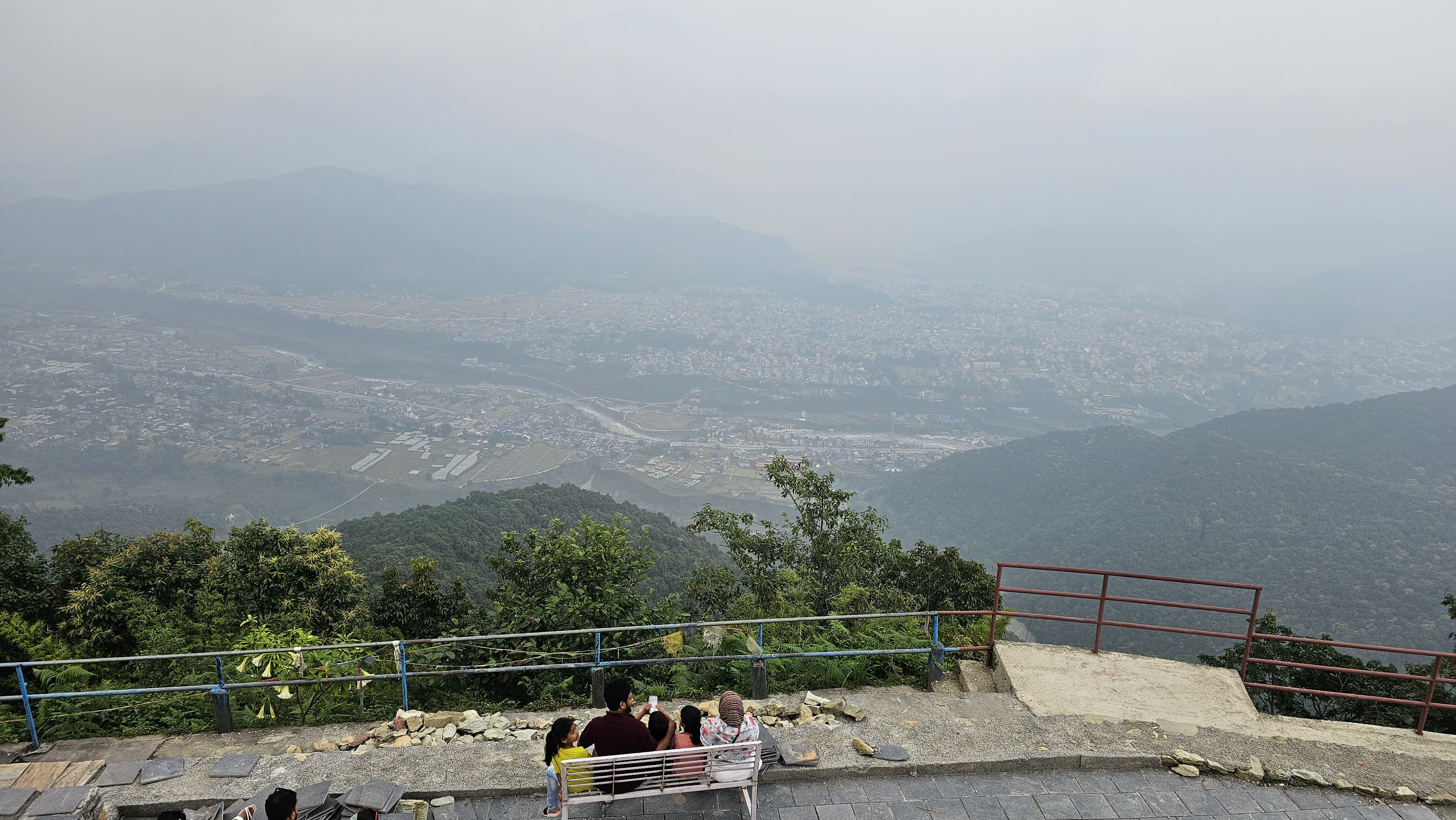
Sarangkot,Pokhara
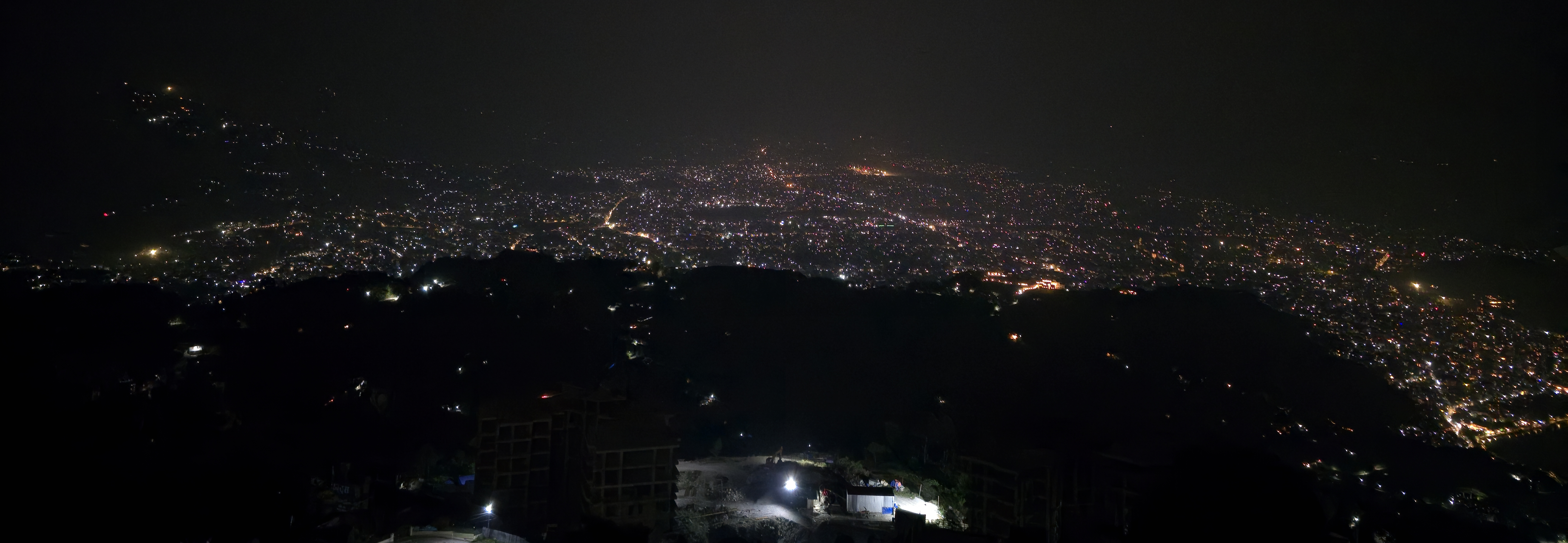
Aerial Night View of Pokhara from Sarangkot
