= Dangsing =

Dangsing may refer to:

- Dangsing, Bagmati, Nepal
- Dangsing, Dhading, Nepal; see Dhading District
- Dangsing, Gadaki, Nepal
