= Chapakot =

Chapakot may refer to:

- Chapakot, Kaski
- Chapakot Municipality
