= Aadalens Træsliberi =

Norwegian pulp mill (1882–1942)

- Formerly: Aadalens Tresliperi; Ådalens Tresliperi; Ådal Tresliperi
- Industry: Wood pulp
- Founded: 1882
- Founders: L. H. Hagen, Ludv. Olsen, Carl A. Larsen, A. Johannesen
- Defunct: 1942
- Fate: Acquired by Follum Fabrikker (1937); destroyed by fire (1942)
- Headquarters: Hensfossen in the Begna river, Ringerike, Buskerud, Norway
- Products: Wood pulp

Aadalens Træsliberi was a Norwegian industrial company that produced wood pulp at Hensfossen in the Begna river, in Ringerike, Buskerud. The company was established in 1882 and closed in 1942.

== History ==
Aadalens Træsliberi was established on the western side of Hensfossen in the Begna river. The mill was founded in 1882 by L. H. Hagen, Ludv. Olsen, Carl A. Larsen and A. Johannesen. In 1883, 4,000 tonnes of wood pulp were produced at Aadalen. The mill was expanded in 1886 to a capacity of 6,000 tonnes on three grindstones, and in 1887 it produced 6,197 tonnes with a workforce of 37 men.

Expansion of the plant continued, and by 1906 six grinding units and six refiners were in operation. The factory also had 18 board machines and an available driving power of 2,400 hp. By 1920 the company operated seven grinding units. In addition to the technical expansion, the owners of Aadalen acquired Heen Tresliperi in 1917. Heen had been founded in 1881 and was located on the eastern side of Hensfossen. In 1920, all grinding operations were transferred from Heen to Aadalen.

=== Acquisition by Follum Fabrikker ===
Aadalen was eventually itself acquired. Follum Træsliberi gradually emerged as the most serious interested party. Follum's purchase of Aadalens Træsliberi was first raised in 1935, but the Follum management declined at that time; two years later the matter was settled, and the Follum board unanimously approved the acquisition of Aadalen. The motive for securing the mill was the timber situation: it was important for Follum that Aadalen did not compete for timber with Follum in the Begna watercourse. In addition, the price of the mill had fallen since the earlier round in 1935. Heen Tresliperi was included in the sale.

It is somewhat unclear when Aadalen began using thermomechanical grinding, but by 1937 two of eight grinding units were configured for this purpose. Power supply had by then been expanded to 3,200 hp from the company's own waterfalls and turbines, in addition to 670 kW from the Heen power station.

When Aadalen was sold in 1937, the mill was producing 40,000 tonnes of wood pulp. Five years after Follum's acquisition, the factory buildings burned down, and wood pulp production was not resumed. In 1945, a power station with a capacity of 16,000 kW was built on the site instead, from which a power line was constructed to transmit electricity to Follum's facilities. The two companies Aadalen and Heen owned the power station at Hensfossen. The housing that had belonged to Aadalens Træsliberi was demolished, and only remnants of the other facilities associated with the mill operations remain.

== Bibliography ==
- Gervin, Ernst (ed.): Follum fabrikker. Et hundre år 1873–1973, pp. 23, 27.
- Kveseth, Per et al. 1998: Follum 125 år. 1873–1998, pp. 20, 31.
- Olsen, Kr. Anker 1948: Follum gjennom 75 år. Oslo, pp. 202, 203, 204.
- Smith, Øyvind 1998: «Fålum» og distriktets treforedling. Kortfattet historisk oversikt over industriens utvikling i Ringerike/Jevnakerområdet.
