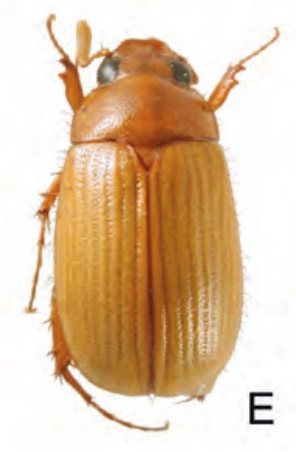

Scientific classification
- Kingdom: Animalia
- Phylum: Arthropoda
- Class: Insecta
- Order: Coleoptera
- Suborder: Polyphaga
- Infraorder: Scarabaeiformia
- Family: Scarabaeidae
- Genus: Neoserica
- Species: N. kaskiensis

Binomial name
- Neoserica kaskiensis Ahrens, 2004

= Neoserica kaskiensis =

Species of beetle

Neoserica kaskiensis is a species of beetle of the family Scarabaeidae. It is found in central Nepal.

== Description ==
Adults reach a length of about 6.7 mm. They have a yellow-brown, elongate-oval body. The elytra are yellow and the entire upper surface highly glossy and glabrous except for a few hairs on the head.

== Etymology ==
The species is named for its occurrence in the Kaski District.
