= Kahun =

Kahun may refer to:

- El-Lahun, Egypt
- Kahun, Nepal
- Kahan, Pakistan
- Dominik Kahun, german ice hockey player
