= Makaikhola =

Village in Gandaki Province, Nepal

Makaikhola मकैखोला
- Village
- Country: Nepal
- Province: Gandaki Province
- District: Kaski District

Population (1991)
  - Total: 3,785
- Time zone: UTC+5:45 (Nepal Time)

Makaikhola मकैखोला is a village about 26 kilometers northeast of Pokhara, Nepal.

The village spreads on either side of a small stream "kamdi khola". Paudel gaun also called Kamdi is on east and subedi gau is on the west of the stream. Literacy rate is over 70% while the unemployment rates are around 50% and those living in the village are mainly into agriculture. Because of this, for the last few years, the young population has been migrating to cities and foreign lands in haunt of jobs and new opportunities.

The village is now connected to the national network of roads via a dirt road. Residents now have access to electricity and telephone services as well. There is no hospital or health post in the village.

Janakalyan higher secondary school is the only high school situated in the village and serves as an educational central for surrounding villages as well.
