= Parche, Nepal =

Parche, Nepal पर्चे
- Village Development Committee
- Location in Nepal Parche, Nepal (Nepal)
- Coordinates: 28.40°N 84.09°E
- Country: Nepal
- Zone: Gandaki Zone
- District: Kaski District

Population (1991)
  - Total: 3,182
- Time zone: UTC+5:45 (Nepal Time)
- Area code: 061

Parche is a town and Village Development Committee (VDC) in Kaski District in the Gandaki Zone of northern-central Nepal. At the 1991 Nepal census, it had a population of 3,182 persons in 669 individual households.

Parche is one of 43 VDCs of Kaski District. It lies north of Dhikur Pokhari VDC and east of Lumle VDC. Sikles is the major village of this VDC where there is traditional in-habitation of Gurung people.
