= Sardi Khola Hydropower Station =

- Location within Nepal
- Official name: Sardi Khola Hydropower Project
- Country: Nepal
- Location: Near Sardikhola, Kaski District
- Coordinates: 28°20′00″N 84°00′35″E
- Purpose: Power
- Status: Operational
- Owner: Mandakini Hydropower Pvt. Ltd.

Dam and spillways
- Type of dam: Gravity
- Impounds: Sardi River

Power Station
- Commission date: 2074-08-23 BS
- Type: Run-of-the-river
- Installed capacity: 4 MW

Sardi Khola Hydropower Station (Nepali: सार्दी खोला जलविद्युत आयोजना) is a run-of-river hydro-electric plant located in Kaski District of Nepal. The flow from Sardi River is used to generate 4 MW electricity. The plant is owned and developed by Mandakini Hydropower Pvt. Ltd., an IPP of Nepal. The plant started generating electricity from 2074-08-23BS. The generation licence will expire in 2105-03-12 BS, after which the plant will be handed over to the government. The power station is connected to the national grid and the electricity is sold to Nepal Electricity Authority.

== See also ==
- List of power stations in Nepal
