= Salyan, Kaski =

Salyan, Kaski सल्यान
- Annapurna Village Council
- Salyan Bhadaure
- Location in Nepal Salyan, Kaski (Nepal)
- Coordinates: 28.28°N 83.79°E
- Country: Nepal
- Zone: Gandaki Zone
- District: Kaski District

Government

Population (1991)
  - Total: 3,254
- Time zone: UTC+5:45 (Nepal Time)

Salyan is a town and Village Development Committee in Kaski District in the Gandaki Zone of northern-central Nepal. At the time of the 1991 Nepal census it had a population of 3,254 persons living in 665 individual households.

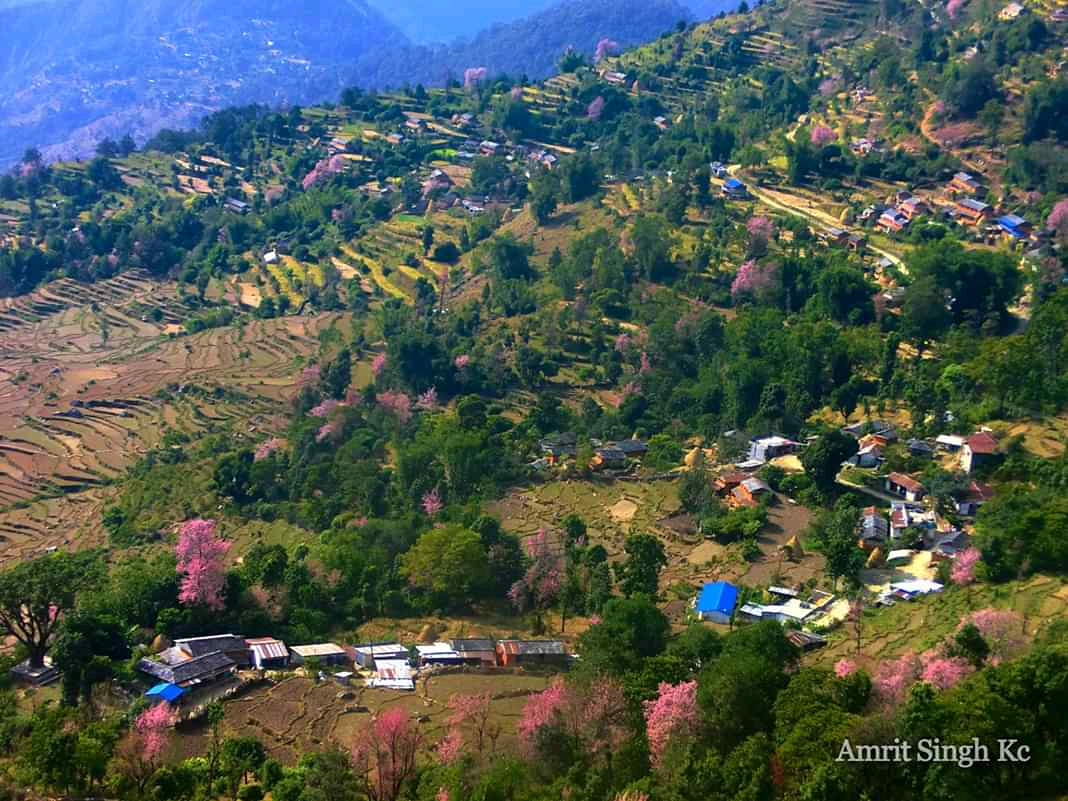

It is around 30 km from Pokhara. People of different ethnicities live here for hundreds of years. Brahmin, Chhetri, Gurung, Magar, are Dalit are the major castes. It is located right below the religious place Panchase. Millet is the major production of this place. There are different species of flora and fauna. There are six primary, secondary, and higher schools, one health post and a roadway got gravelled and plastered (2020/2021). Shree Pragatisheel and Bhadaure are the only two higher school in this area. People run local shops for groceries, and small scale industries for their livelihood. The main occupation is Agriculture. The Famous and religious place/temple of Salyan is Bhumethan Temple which is located in the head of Salyan. Countable clean and healthy homestays are available for local and foreign tourists as it is an integral part of tourists to hangout near around Pokhara valley. Main streets shops are on services in Bhadaure, Bashkharka and Hulak.
