= Majhthana =

Majhthana माझठाना
- Village Development Committee
- Location in Nepal Majhthana (Nepal)
- Coordinates: 28.21°N 84.12°E
- Country: Nepal
- Zone: Gandaki Zone
- District: Kaski District

Population (1991)
  - Total: 3,670
- Time zone: UTC+5:45 (Nepal Time)
- Postal code: 33704
- Area code: 061

Majhthana is a town and Village Development Committee in Kaski District in the Gandaki Zone of northern-central Nepal. At the time of the 1991 Nepal census it had a population of 3,670 persons living in 791 individual households.
