= Arba Vijaya =

Arba अर्बा
- Village/Tole
- Location in Nepal Arba (Nepal)
- Coordinates: 28.24°N 84.04°E
- Country: Nepal
- Zone: Gandaki Zone
- District: Kaski District
- City: Pokhara

Population (1991)
  - Total: 3,446
- Time zone: UTC+5:45 (Nepal Time)

Arba Vijaya is a very old residential area in Pokhara sub-metropolitan city in Kaski District in the Gandaki Zone of northern-central Nepal. At the 1991 Nepal census, it had a population of 3,446 persons living in 714 individual households. The village is located in the Annapurna Himalayan region. It can be reached from Pokhara by 2 hours of walking or a 30-minute drive. The village has many natural sources, most of people living at villages are Brahmin, chettri, Gurung, Bishwakarma, Pariyar caste.

Geography Located north east of Pokhara valley, it is surrounded by Vijayapur river in south and east whereas kaunkhola is in west. Mauja village lies on north of arba. Arba is divided into hill and plain land. Majority of people live in hill whereas influx of people is getting higher in plain area from other near villages such as Sikles, Taprang, Kalika, Tarkang and Tangting.
