= Sardikhola =

Sardikhola सार्दीखोला
- Village Development Committee
- Location in Nepal Sardikhola (Nepal)
- Coordinates: 28.37°N 84.01°E
- Country: Nepal
- Zone: Gandaki Zone
- District: Kaski District

Population (1991)
  - Total: 3,213
- Time zone: UTC+5:45 (Nepal Time)

Sardikhola is a town and Village Development Committee in Kaski District in the Gandaki Zone of northern-central Nepal. At the time of the 2011 Nepal census it had a population of 7027 persons living in 1745 individual households.

== See also ==
- Sardi Khola Hydropower Station
