= Lwangghale =

Lwang Ghalel ल्वाङ घलेल
- Village Development Committee
- Location in Nepal Lwang Ghalel (Nepal)
- Coordinates: 28.45°N 83.91°E
- Country: Nepal
- Zone: Gandaki Zone
- District: Kaski District

Population (1991)
  - Total: 4,758
- Time zone: UTC+5:45 (Nepal Time)

Lwangghale or Lwang-Ghalel is a town and Village Development Committee in Kaski District in the Gandaki Zone of northern-central Nepal. At the time of the 1991 Nepal census it had a population of 4,758 persons living in 973 individual households.
