= Thumki =

Thumki थुम्की
- Village Development Committee
- Location in Nepal Thumki (Nepal)
- Coordinates: 28.15°N 84.19°E
- Country: Nepal
- Zone: Gandaki Zone
- District: Kaski District

Population (1991)
  - Total: 3,946
- Time zone: UTC+5:45 (Nepal Time)

Thumki is a town and Village Development Committee in Kaski District in the Gandaki Zone of northern-central Nepal. At the time of the 1991 Nepal census it had a population of 3,946 persons living in 778 individual households.
