= Ribhan =

Ribhan रिभान
- Village Development Committee
- Location in Nepal Ribhan (Nepal)
- Coordinates: 28.34°N 83.91°E
- Country: Nepal
- Zone: Gandaki Zone
- District: Kaski District

Population (2001)
  - Total: 1,617
- Time zone: UTC+5:45 (Nepal Time)

Ribhan (रिभान, transcribed also as "'Reevan'" and "'Rivan'") is a village and Village Development Committee in Kaski District in the Gandaki Zone of northern-central Nepal. At the time of the 2001 Nepal census it had a population of 1,617 persons living in 372 individual households. Brahmin and Gurung are main ethnic groups in this village. Ribhan is mainly a settlement on the bank of Mardi river which is the main source of irrigation for people of this agriculture-based village. The forest in this village has many endangered species such as Himali red panda and leopard. Much of its forest is still unexplored as it is very remote with high and often snow-bound hills. It is a part of Annapurna Conservation Area project .
