= Thumakodada =

Thumakodanda थुमाकोडाँडा
- Village Development Committee
- Location in Nepal Thumakodanda (Nepal)
- Coordinates: 28.26°N 84.10°E
- Country: Nepal
- Zone: Gandaki Zone
- District: Kaski District

Population (1991)
  - Total: 4,301
- Time zone: UTC+5:45 (Nepal Time)

Thumakodanda is a town and Village Development Committee in Kaski District in the Gandaki Zone of northern-central Nepal. At the time of the 1991 Nepal census it had a population of 4,301 persons living in 857 individual households.
