= Kristinachnechaur =

Coordinates: 28°9′N 83°57′E

Kristinachnechaur कृस्ती नाच्नेचौर
- Subdivision of Pokhara
- Location in Nepal Kristinachnechaur (Nepal)
- Country: Nepal
- Zone: Gandaki Zone
- District: Kaski District

Population (1991)
  - Total: 5,757
- Time zone: UTC+5:45 (Nepal Time)

Kristinachnechaur is a former Village Development Committee south of Pokhara in Kaski District in the Gandaki Zone of northern-central Nepal. In 2015, it was annexed to Pokhara. At the 1991 Nepal census, it had a population of 5,757 persons in 1,145 individual households.
