= Sildujure =

Sildujure सिल्दुजुरे
- Village Development Committee
- Location in Nepal Sildujure (Nepal)
- Coordinates: 28.31°N 84.06°E
- Country: Nepal
- Zone: Gandaki Zone
- District: Kaski District

Population (1991)
  - Total: 3,724
- Time zone: UTC+5:45 (Nepal Time)
- Postal code: 33705
- Area code: 061

Sildujure is a town and Village Development Committee in Kaski District in the Gandaki Zone of northern-central Nepal. At the time of the 1991 Nepal census it had a population of 3,724 persons living in 746 individual households.
