= Sinkholes of Armala =

Sinkhole in Nepal

Location of Armala

In between November 2013 to 2017, more than 200 sinkholes were formed in the Armala area of Pokhara. The sinkholes were formed mostly in the paddy fields in the alluvial fan deposit. The sinkholes terrorised and displaced hundreds of local residents.

== Sinkholes in 2013 ==
In 2013, about 30 sink holes were formed in both sides of Duhuni Khola. The holes had a diameter of about 10m and depth of about 7m. Locals reported flow of muddy silty water outlet at the Kali Khola about one week before the first sinkhole appeared in November 2013. The sinkholes were completely filled up later.

== Sinkholes in 2014 ==
More than 150 sinkholes appeared between 2013 and 2014 in the same area. This time the sinkholes affected the agricultural farmland, collapse of cowsheds in a house of a local resident. The hole near the house was filled up by the owner.

Most of the sink holes were located on the western side of river. Some of the new sinkholes were the old sinkholes. A series of progressive sinkholes along a straight line were also identified.

== Geological observations ==
The sinkhole is composed of silty clay, sand, and gravel. The area has a layer of thick white silt in depth of 4 m to 20 m. A hidden cavity of 2.5 m wide was found at a depth of 7.5 m to 10 m.

The scrap from nearby Kali Khola identified 0.05 m thick sand seam layer between the silty clay layers at a depth of 9 m from the ground surface, which was similar to the level of sinkhole cavity. At the outcrop of Kali khola, groundwater flowing out from the interface of sand and silty clay layers were observed. An internal erosion was found at both the side of a sand layer. The internal erosion was not taking place at that location if there was only the presence of silty clay in the subsurface of Armala. The seepage groundwater from the hillside to the mainstream was the main source of erosion.

The groundwater flow is believed to trigger the formation of sinkholes. The Armala area is speculated to be actively eroding since hundreds of years which has caused gradual dissolving of small parts of soluble soil. This created caverns.

The geo-physical survey found that excessive use of natural resources and encroachment of water resources as the major cause of the caving.

== Risk ==
The area used to be an agriculture land for most part of its history. Recently, there was an abrupt development of infrastructures. Due the sink holes, approximately 70 households has high risk.

A high potential of catastrophe is predicted in case of seismic event in the area.

The earthquake of 2015, some muddy water was observed at the outlet of the Kali River indicating alteration of subsoil conditions in some ways. However, no new sinkholes were formed and the size of existing sinkholes did not change.

The Disaster Prevention Department has prohibited paddy plantation in the area for five years to reduce water seepage. However, locals were allowed to cultivate vegetables which require less amount of water. It has been learnt that a study around five decades ago had also recommended not to establish any human settlement in the area.
