= Ghachok =

Ghachok घाचोक
- Village Development Committee
- Location in Nepal Ghachok (Nepal)
- Coordinates: 28.33°N 83.94°E
- Country: Nepal
- Zone: Gandaki Zone
- District: Kaski District

Population (1991)
  - Total: 2,322
- Time zone: UTC+5:45 (Nepal Time)
- Postal code: 33712
- Area code: 061

Ghachok is a village and Village Development Committee in Kaski District in the Gandaki Zone of northern-central Nepal. At the 1991 Nepal census, it had a population of 2,322 persons in 449 individual households.
