= Nirmalpokhari =

Nirmal pokhari निर्मल पोखरी
- Village Development Committee
- Location in Nepal Nirmal pokhari (Nepal)
- Coordinates: 28.16°N 83.99°E
- Country: Nepal
- Zone: Gandaki Zone
- District: Kaski District

Population (1991)
  - Total: 4,386
- Time zone: UTC+5:45 (Nepal Time)
- Postal code: 33706
- Area code: 061

Nirmal pokhari is a town and Village Development Committee in Kaski District in the Gandaki Zone of northern-central Nepal. At the time of the 1991 Nepal census it had a population of 4,386 persons living in 897 individual households.
