= Dhital, Nepal =

Dhital, Nepal धिताल
- Tourism Village
- Location in Nepal Dhital, Nepal (Nepal)
- Coordinates: 28.31°N 83.89°E
- Rural Municipality: Machhapuchhre Rural municipality
- Zone: Gandaki Zone
- District: Kaski District

Government
  - Type: Local Government
  - Mayor: Min Bahadur Gurung
  - Chairman: Teknath Gautam

Population (1991)
  - Total: 4,121
- Time zone: UTC+5:45 (Nepal Time)
- Postal code: 33700

Dhital, formerly a village development committee in Kaski District, Gandaki Zone, is now located in Machhapuchhre rural municipality, ward number 6 in Kaski district, Gandaki Province, Nepal. At the 1991 Nepal census, it had a population of 4,121 persons in 862 individual households. Dhital is near Annapurna Himalaya and on its trekking route.

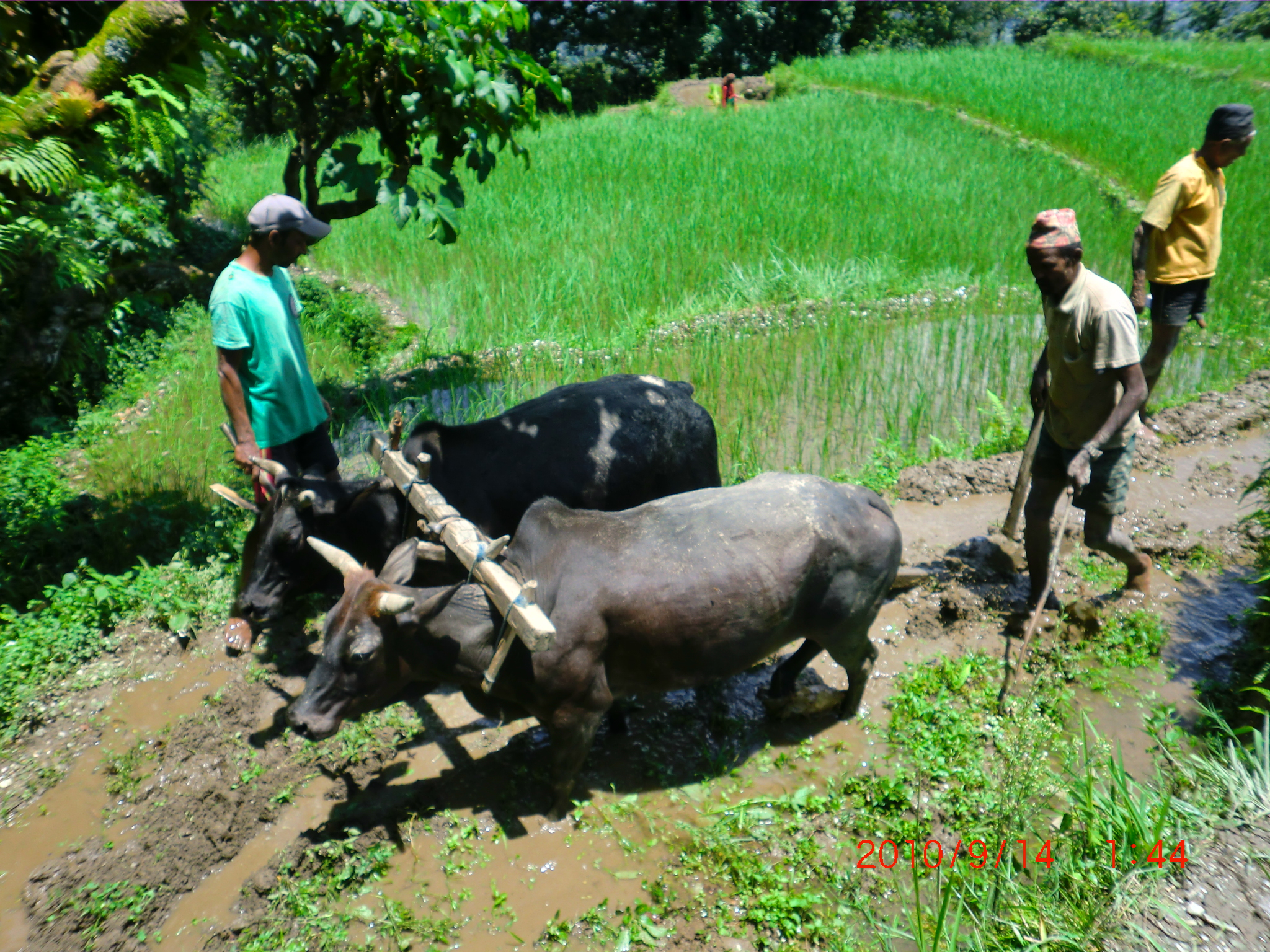
Dhital Village kaski Nepal

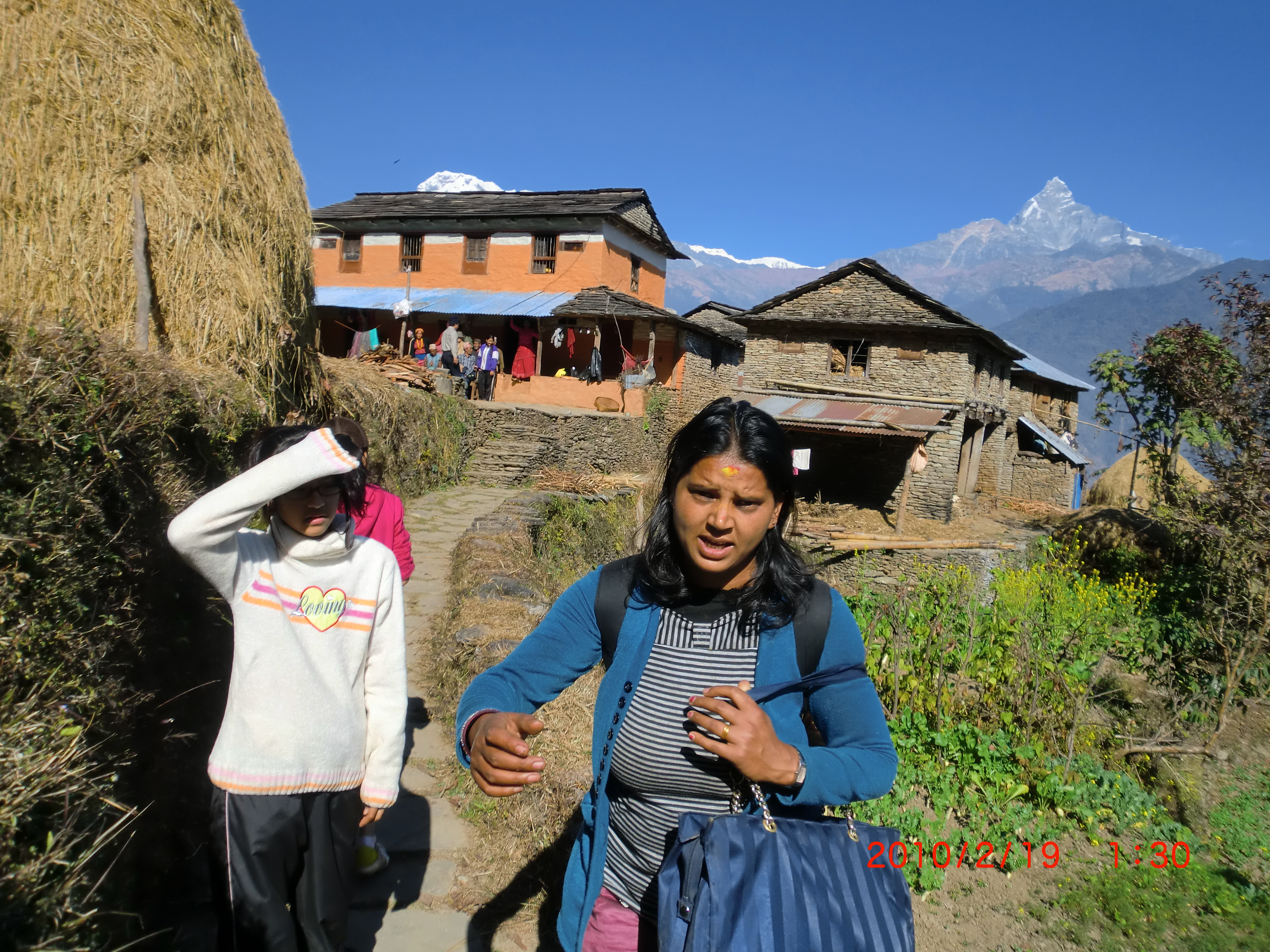
Dhital House kaski Nepal
