= Lumle =

Lumle लुम्ले
- VDC; Hill station
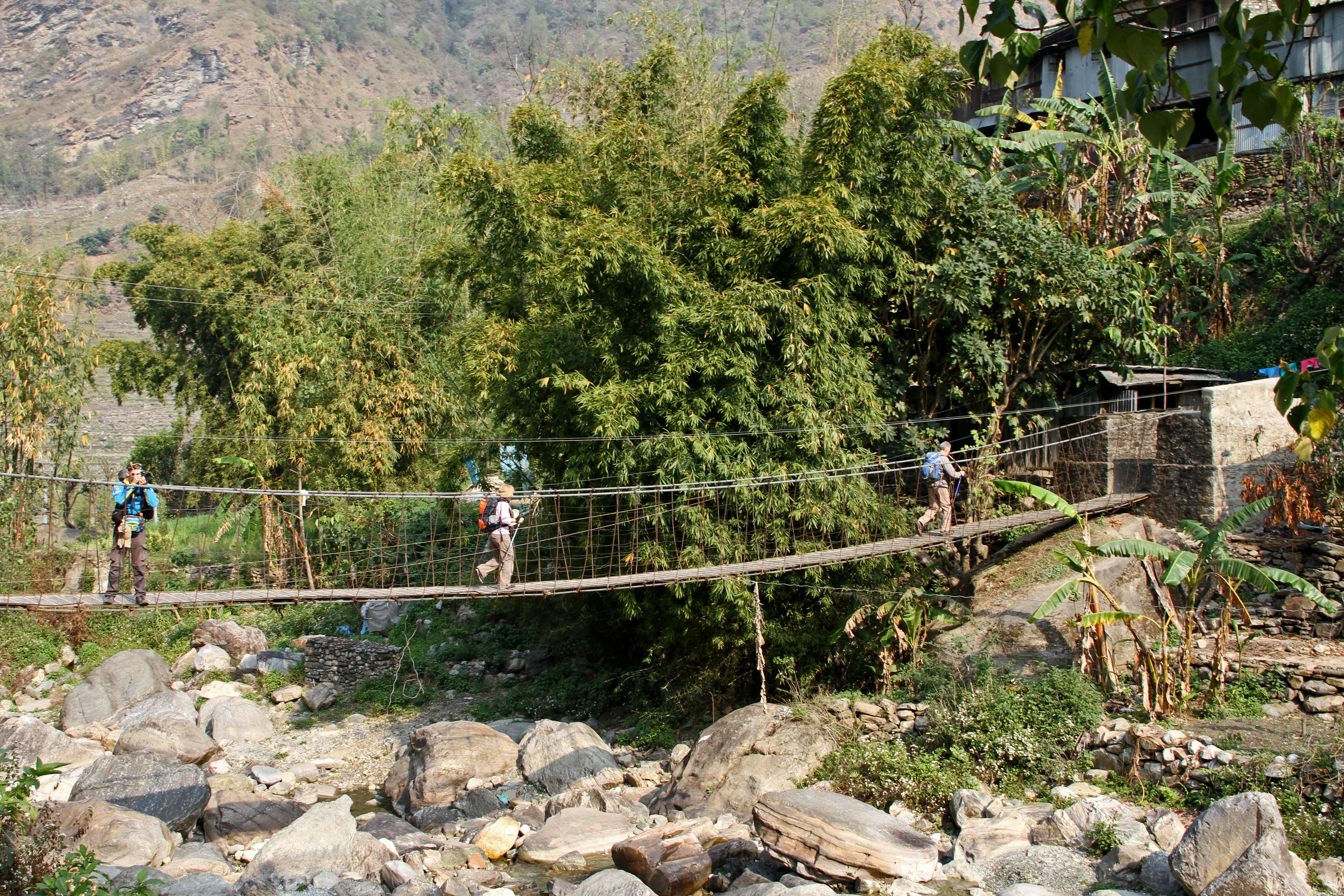
- Bridge over Dhoti Khola

- Location in Nepal Lumle (Nepal)
- Coordinates: 28.35°N 83.83°E
- Country: Nepal
- Zone: Gandaki Zone
- District: Kaski District

Population (1991)
  - Total: 4,685
- Time zone: UTC+5:45 (NST)
- Area code: 061

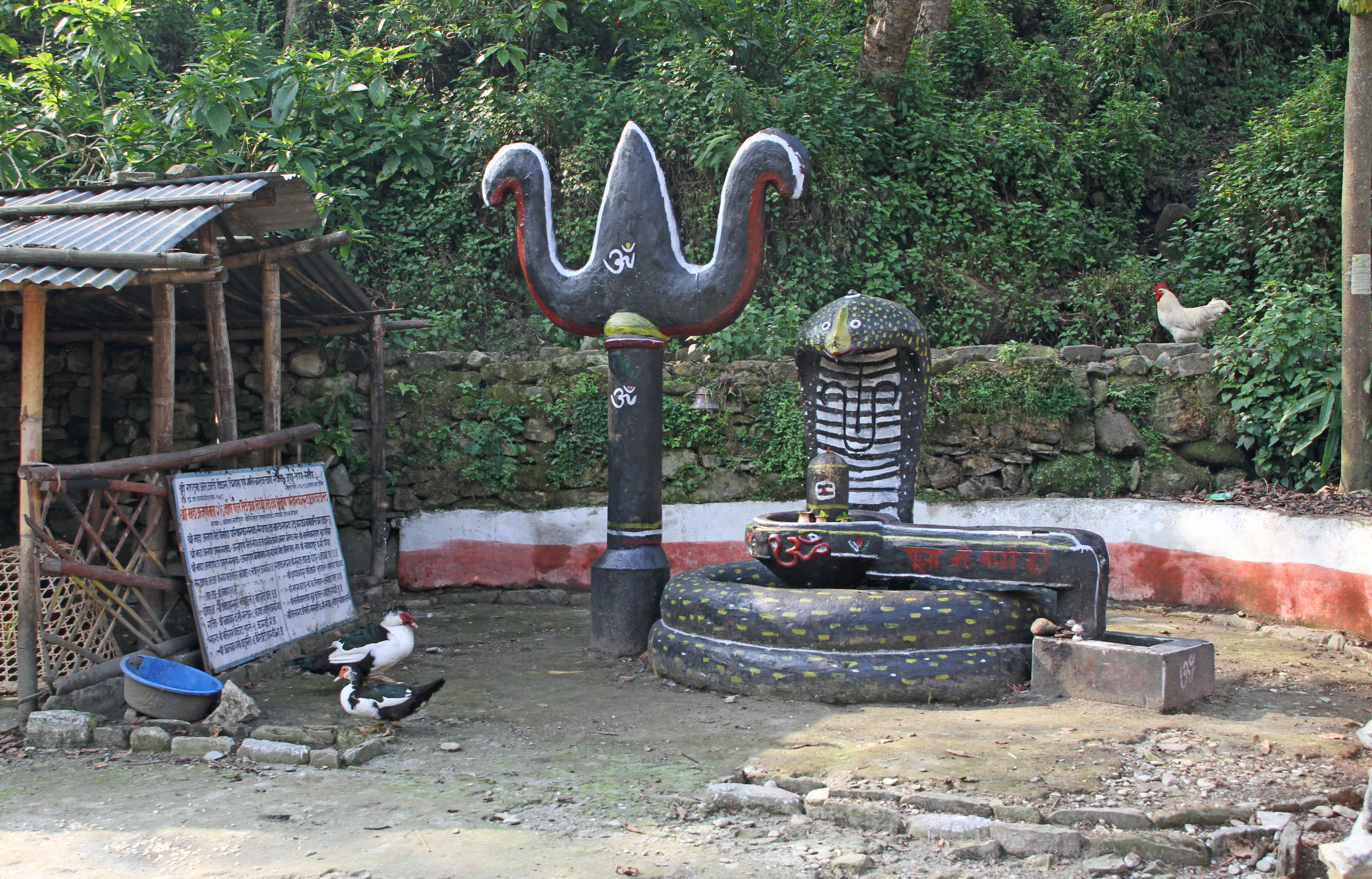
Shiva sanctuary in Nayapul

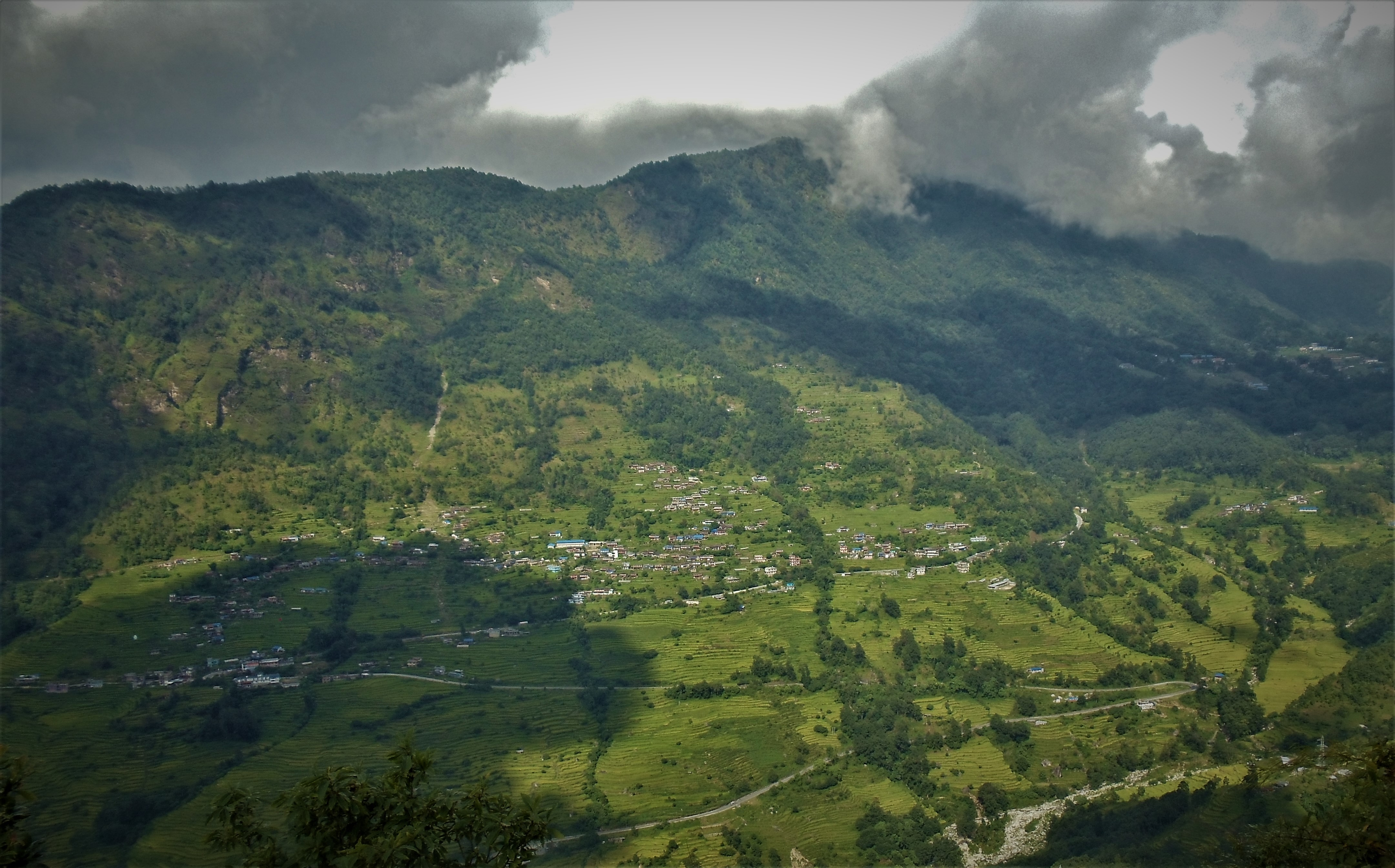
Lumle Village landscape

Lumle is a town and Annapurna Rural Municipality, Kaski Kaski District in the Gandaki Zone of northern-central Nepal. At the 1991 Nepal census, it had a population of 4,685 persons in 955 individual households.

Lumle is well known for its agricultural centre on a hillside above the village founded in 1968 to train British Gurkha ex-servicemen farmers. Its role was expanded in 1975 to benefit the communities from which Gurkhas were recruited in Mid-West Hills. It is now part of Nepal Agricultural Research Council.

== Localities ==
- Tanchowk

== Educational institutions in Lumle ==
- Balmandir Community School (community)
- Future Star English Boarding School (private)
- Shree Siddha Lower Secondary School (government)
- Shree Sangam Secondary School (government)
- Srijana Secondary School (government)
- Shree Paudurkot Lower Secondary School (government)

== Climate ==
Climate data for Lumle, elevation 1,738 m (5,702 ft), (1991–2020 normals, extremes 1969–2017)
Month	Jan	Feb	Mar	Apr	May	Jun	Jul	Aug	Sep	Oct	Nov	Dec	Year
Record high °C (°F)	21.5 (70.7)	22.5 (72.5)	25.7 (78.3)	29.5 (85.1)	31.0 (87.8)	29.5 (85.1)	31.0 (87.8)	28.5 (83.3)	28.5 (83.3)	29.6 (85.3)	25.5 (77.9)	22.0 (71.6)	31.0 (87.8)
Mean daily maximum °C (°F)	13.9 (57.0)	15.8 (60.4)	19.8 (67.6)	22.8 (73.0)	23.5 (74.3)	24.0 (75.2)	23.8 (74.8)	23.9 (75.0)	23.3 (73.9)	21.6 (70.9)	18.4 (65.1)	15.2 (59.4)	20.5 (68.9)
Daily mean °C (°F)	9.3 (48.7)	11.2 (52.2)	14.7 (58.5)	17.6 (63.7)	18.9 (66.0)	20.4 (68.7)	20.8 (69.4)	20.8 (69.4)	19.9 (67.8)	17.3 (63.1)	13.9 (57.0)	10.7 (51.3)	16.3 (61.3)
Mean daily minimum °C (°F)	4.7 (40.5)	6.5 (43.7)	9.5 (49.1)	12.4 (54.3)	14.3 (57.7)	16.7 (62.1)	17.8 (64.0)	17.6 (63.7)	16.5 (61.7)	12.9 (55.2)	9.3 (48.7)	6.1 (43.0)	12.0 (53.6)
Record low °C (°F)	−1.2 (29.8)	−0.3 (31.5)	0.6 (33.1)	4.8 (40.6)	5.5 (41.9)	9.9 (49.8)	10.0 (50.0)	10.2 (50.4)	10.0 (50.0)	4.5 (40.1)	3.0 (37.4)	0.5 (32.9)	−1.2 (29.8)
Average precipitation mm (inches)	34.9 (1.37)	51.4 (2.02)	68.5 (2.70)	122.8 (4.83)	309.4 (12.18)	866.0 (34.09)	1,473.2 (58.00)	1,419.4 (55.88)	903.2 (35.56)	208.0 (8.19)	19.7 (0.78)	15.5 (0.61)	5,492 (216.22)
Source: Department of Hydrology and Meteorology
