= Armala =

Armala अर्मला
- Sub-metropolitan city
- Location in Nepal Armala (Nepal)
- Coordinates: 28.29°N 84.01°E
- Country: Nepal
- Zone: Gandaki Zone
- District: Kaski District

Area
  - Total: 36.01 km^{2} (13.90 sq mi)

Population (1991)
  - Total: 4,921
  - Density: 136.7/km^{2} (353.9/sq mi)
- Time zone: UTC+5:45 (Nepal Time)

Armala is a town and sub-metropolitan city in the Kaski District of the Gandaki Zone of northern-central Nepal. In the 1991 Nepal census, it had a population of 4,921 people living in 1,012 households.

Armala Smart City lies in the northern part of the Kaski District of Gandaki Zone of Nepal. The Smart City borders Sildure to the north, Gharmi Pokhara from north–south, Mauja to the east, Puranchaur Smart City to the west, and Pokhara Metropolitan City and Valam to the south.

The area is divided into nine administrative wards covering 36.01 km^{2}. Easy access is provided by a gravel road that connects with the Mahendra Cave Armala Road.

While there is no confirmed origin for Armala's name, there are a couple of popular theories:

1. The name comes from a fruit named "Amala" which once grew abundantly in the region. Later, the name turned into "Armala."
2. Farmers whose livestock consumed crops paid a fine known as "Armal." As the system of paying Armal became more commonplace, people began to refer to the region as "Armal" which later became "Armala."

Armala is surrounded by thick forests, as well as a diverse bio structure of flora and fauna. Some local plants include: Chanp, Katus, Uttis, Kalche, Laligurans (Rhododendron), Chandan, Kafal, Falat, Lalupate, Paiyeu, Simal etc.
Different animals like tigers, bears, leopards, nyale bag, harin, goral, foxes, jackals, rabbits, deer, and wild cats.
Different birds like danfe, munal, eagles, vultures, sparrows, dangers, cranes, ureli, dhikur, ban kukhura, kalij, crows, maluwa, litchi, titro, parrots, raja chara, rani chara etc. are found here.

Kalamuda, located within Armala, provides the drinking water for the Pokhara Metropolitan City and surrounding areas.

== Climate ==
Temperatures range from highs of 35 °C in the summer to lows of 4 °C during the winter. To the north lies the Annapurna Range.

== Points of Interest ==
There are many tourist attractions in Armala. Because of its altitude, there are many observation points, including Jhuprangkot, Armala kot (altitude 2640m), Armala kot (altitude 1640m), Nagi, and Dhikidanda. Armala is also home to a large collection of traditional temples - for example, in Dehi Gaun, Armala kot, and Naudhara. Natural wonders include caves - for example, crazy cave in Simlekuna.

== Places ==
1) Damaha Dhunga: Damaha Dhunga is a mysterious and unique place. Anyone who hits this stone with a small one by offering flowers to it, water pours from it the same as tears from eyes. According to Hindu mythology, if one pleads a wish while offering flowers to this stone and drops of water pour from the stone, it is said that the wish then gets fulfilled.

2) Crazy Cave: This cave is around 600 m in length. Limestones can be found sparkling like diamonds in the ceiling about 25 meters inside at a 45-degree angle. Moving ahead and watching different structures inside the cave, there is a really attractive place that is suitable for meditation. Moving even further, other caves can be seen within the cave, which is an adventurous and delightfully interesting setting. Further below, there is a water pond. Visitors can go almost 1,000 m inside the cave during Asad to Falgun, or up to 1,200 m from Chaitra to Jeth.

3) Holi Cave: This cave is suitable for meditation. The cave contains two types of bats, dependent on the weather. There are two entry points for the cave, one at the North and one at the East. It is a delightfully interesting and visually engaging walk from the eastern entry, while it is a long walk that offers plenty of time to meditate if the northern entry is used. This cave runs approximately 800 m in length.

Organization promoting Armala Tourism: Armala Tourism Sector and Community Development Organization President:- Gurudatta Bhattarai

== See also ==
- Sinkholes of Armala
