= Bhadaure Tamagi =

Bhadaure Tamagi भदौरे तामागी
- Village Development Committee
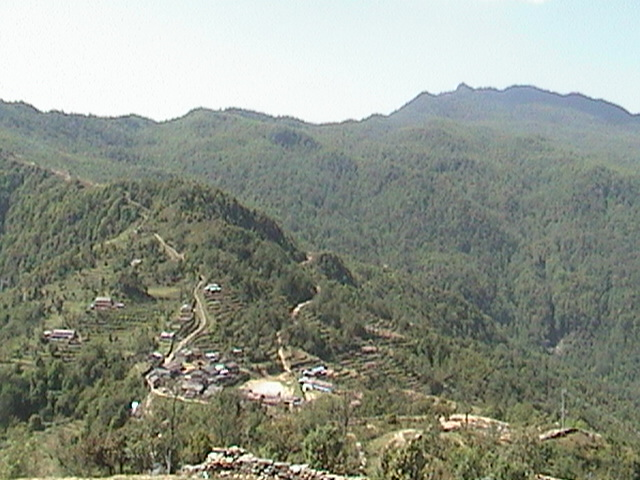

- Location in Nepal Bhadaure Tamagi (Nepal)
- Coordinates: 28.25°N 83.85°E
- Country: Nepal
- Zone: Gandaki Zone
- District: Kaski District

Population (1991)
  - Total: 3,543
- Time zone: UTC+5:45 (Nepal Time)

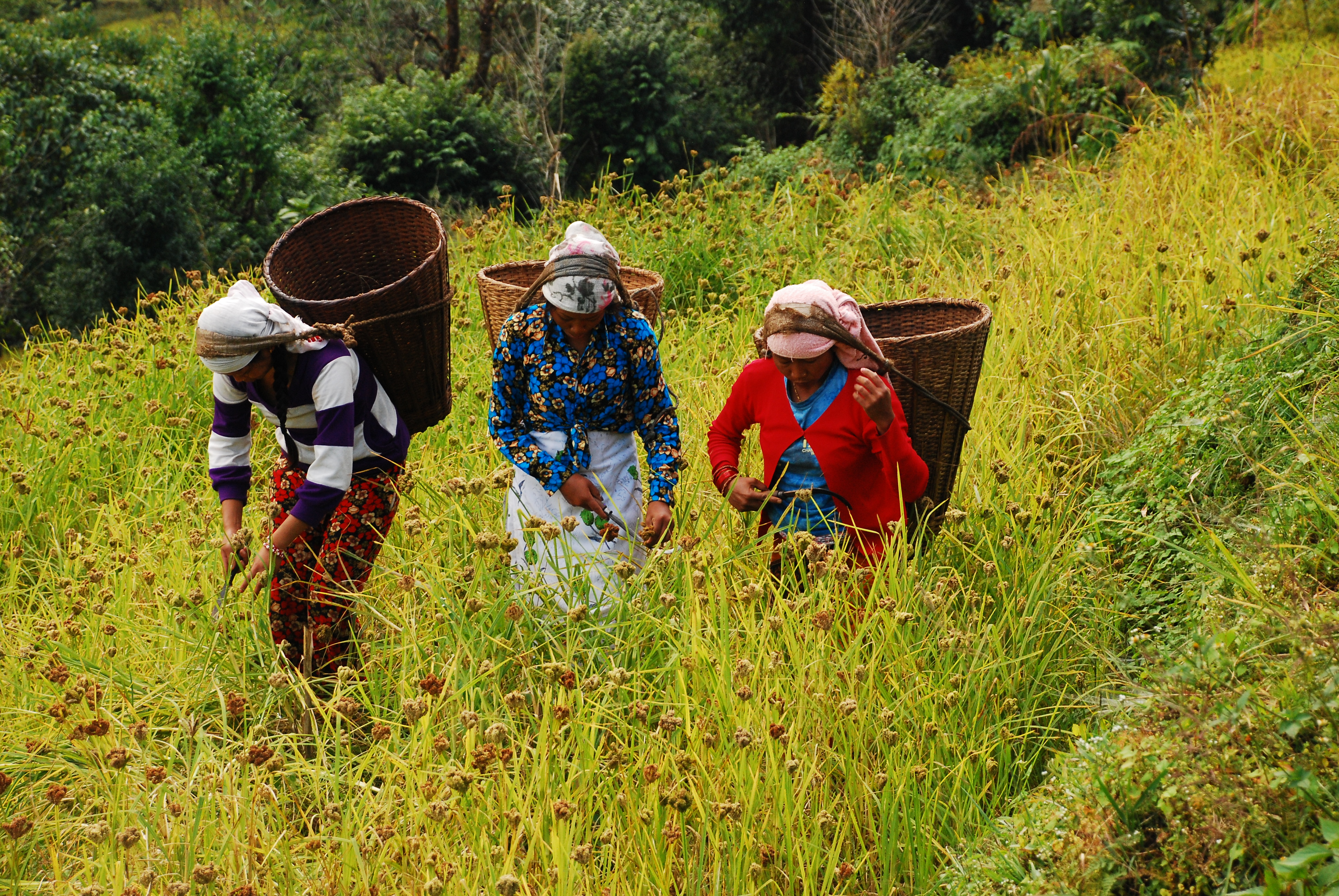
Farming in Bhadaure Tamagi, Kaski

Bhadaure Tamagi is a town and Village Development Committee in Kaski District in the Gandaki Zone of northern-central Nepal. At the 1991 Nepal census, it had a population of 3,543 persons in 692 individual households.

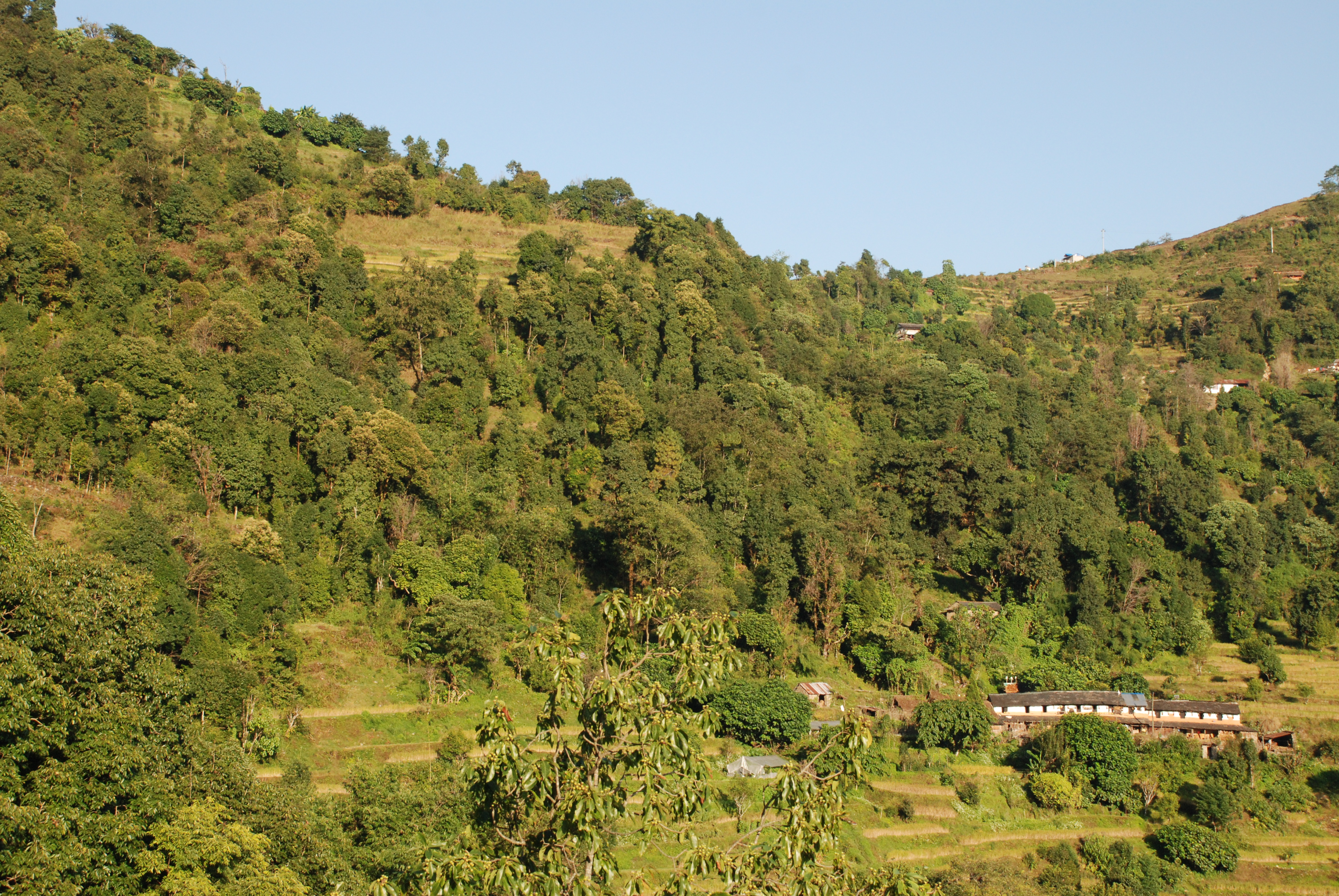
View from Bhadaure Tamagi, Kaski
