= Shisuwa =

Shisuwa शिसुवा
- Village Development Committee
- Country: Nepal
- Zone: Gandaki Zone
- District: Kaski District

Population (1991)
  - Total: 12,127
- Time zone: UTC+5:45 (Nepal Time)

Shisuwa is a town and once a Village Development Committee in Kaski District in the Gandaki Zone of northern-central Nepal. At the time of the 1991 Nepal census it had a population of 12,127.

From local era 2054 B.S., it has been merged with other four village development committee to form Lekhnath Municipality. Lekhnath occupies the eastern half of Pokhara Valley, and the municipality was later administratively merged to Pokhara metropolis.
