= Mala, Nepal =

Coordinates: 27°11′N 86°43′E

Mala, Nepal माला
- Village Development Committee
- Location in Nepal Mala, Nepal (Nepal)
- Country: Nepal
- Zone: Gandaki Zone
- District: Kaski District

Population (1991)
  - Total: 2,704
- Time zone: UTC+5:45 (Nepal Time)

Mala is a village and Village Development Committee in Kaski District in the Gandaki Zone of northern-central Nepal. At the time of the 1991 Nepal census it had a population of 2,704 persons living in 510 individual households.
