= Hemja =

Hemja हेम्जा ward no 25
- subdivision of Pokhara
- Location in Nepal Hemja (Nepal)
- Coordinates: 28.28°N 83.92°E
- Country: Nepal
- Province: Gandaki Province
- District: Kaski District

Population (2011)
  - Total: 12,262
- Time zone: UTC+5:45 (Nepal Time)

Hemja is a former Village Development Committee in the north of Pokhara in Kaski District in the Gandaki Province of northern-central Nepal. In 2014, Hemja was annexed to Pokhara City as ward number 27. Hemja is now an administrative part of Pokhara Municipality ward #25. At the 2011 Nepal census, it had a population of 12,262 persons in 3,019 households.
