= Kalika, Kaski =

Kalika कालिका
- Village Development Committee
- Location in Nepal Kalika (Nepal)
- Coordinates: 28.23°N 84.07°E
- Country: Nepal
- Zone: Gandaki Zone
- District: Kaski District

Population (1991)
  - Total: 4,688
- Time zone: UTC+5:45 (Nepal Time)

Kalika is a town and Village Development Committee in Kaski District in the Gandaki Zone of northern-central Nepal. At the time of the 1991 Nepal census it had a population of 4,688 persons living in 949 individual households.

The Thulakot and Chitrakot hills are the historically important places of Kalika VDC. Kalika Temple in Kalikasthan was established by Raj Shah in the 15th century.
