= Namarjung =

Namarjung नामार्जुङ
- Village Development Committee
- Location in Nepal Namarjung (Nepal)
- Coordinates: 28.43°N 84.18°E
- Country: Nepal
- Zone: Gandaki Zone
- District: Kaski District

Population (1991)
  - Total: 1,553
- Time zone: UTC+5:45 (Nepal Time)

Namarjung is a village and Village Development Committee in Kaski District in the Gandaki Zone of northern-central Nepal. At the time of the 1991 Nepal census it had a population of 1,553 persons living in 330 individual households.
