= Siddha, Kaski =

Siddha सिद्ध
- Village Development Committee
- Location in Nepal Siddha (Nepal)
- Coordinates: 28.11°N 84.20°E
- Country: Nepal
- Zone: Gandaki Zone
- District: Kaski District

Population (1991)
  - Total: 3,322
- Time zone: UTC+5:45 (Nepal Time)

Siddha is a town and Village Development Committee in Kaski District in the Gandaki Zone of northern-central Nepal. At the time of the 1991 Nepal census it had a population of 3,322 persons living in 672 individual households.
