= Hansapur, Kaski =

Hansapur, Kaski हंसपुर
- Village Development Committee
- Location in Nepal Hansapur, Kaski (Nepal)
- Coordinates: 28.19°N 84.18°E
- Country: Nepal
- Zone: Gandaki Zone
- District: Kaski District

Population (1991)
  - Total: 4,761
- Time zone: UTC+5:45 (Nepal Time)
- Website: https://www.facebook.com/gautam.shrestha65?notif_t=page_new_likes

Hansapur is a town and Village Development Committee in Kaski District in the Gandaki Zone of northern-central Nepal. At the 1991 Nepal census, it had a population of 4,761 persons in 956 individual households.
