= Deurali, Kaski =

Coordinates: 28°7′N 84°10′E

Deurali देउराली
- Village Development Committee
- Deurali
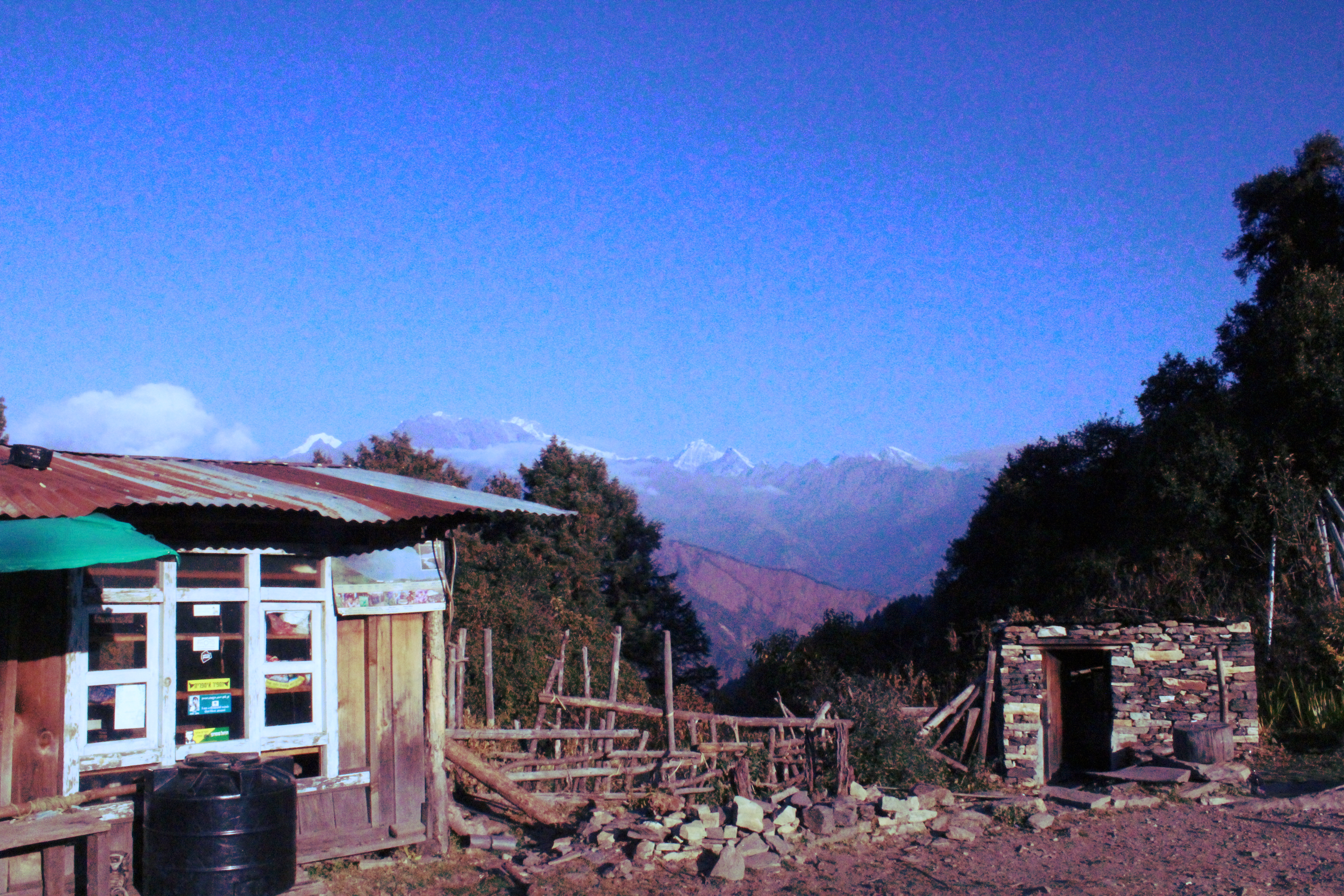
- Ganesh Himal from Deurali, Kaski
- Interactive map of Deurali
- Country: Nepal
- Zone: Gandaki Zone
- District: Kaski District
- Elevation: 3,200 m (10,500 ft)

Population (1991)
  - Total: 2,882
- Time zone: UTC+5:45 (Nepal Time)

Deurali is a Village Development Committee in Kaski District of the Gandaki Province of north-central Nepal. At the time of the 1991 Nepal census, it had a population of 2,882. The base camp of Mount Machapuchare is situated at a 6-hour uphill trek from the village.

Being the furthest human-settled village en route to the Machapuchare base camp, Deurali falls in an avalanche-prone region, with the most recent incident of human casualty reported on January 17, 2020.

Deurali also serves as a key stop on the Annapurna Base Camp trek. The trail from Deurali to Annapurna Base Camp spans 7.7 kilometers and takes approximately 4 to 5 hours of gradual ascent, following the Modi River past scenic alpine terrain and icy rock walls.
