= Rakhi, Nepal =

Rakhi, Nepal राखी Nupur Goyal
- Village Development Committee
- Country: Nepal
- Zone: Gandaki Zone
- District: Kaski District

Population (1991)
  - Total: 4,229
- Time zone: UTC+5:45 (Nepal Time)

Rakhi, Nepal is a town and Village Development Committee (VDC) in Kaski District in the Gandaki Zone of northern-central Nepal. At the 1991 Nepal census, the VDC had a population of 4,229 persons in 903 individual households.
