= Pumdibhumdi =

Pumdibhumdi पुम्दीभुम्दी
- Subdivision of Pokhara
- Location in Nepal Pumdibhumdi (Nepal)
- Coordinates: 28.20°N 83.92°E
- Country: Nepal
- Zone: Gandaki Zone
- District: Kaski District

Population (1991)
  - Total: 6,512
- Time zone: UTC+5:45 (Nepal Time)

Pumdibhumdi is a former Village Development Committee south of Pokhara in Kaski District in the Gandaki Zone of northern-central Nepal. In 2015 it was annexed to Pokhara. At the 1991 Nepal census, its population comprised 6,512 persons in 1,326 individual households.
