= Bhachok =

Bhachok भाचोक
- Village Development Committee
- Location in Nepal Bhachok (Nepal)
- Coordinates: 28.25°N 84.15°E
- Country: Nepal
- Zone: Gandaki Zone
- District: Kaski District

Population (1991)
  - Total: 2,084
- Time zone: UTC+5:45 (Nepal Time)

Bhachok is a village and Village Development Committee in Kaski District in the Gandaki Zone of northern-central Nepal. At the 1991 Nepal census, it had a population of 2,084.
