= Mauja =

Mauja मौजा
- Village Development Committee
- history Mauja (Nepal)
- Coordinates: 28.27°N 84.04°E
- Country: Nepal
- Zone: Gandaki Zone
- District: Kaski District

Population (1991)
  - Total: 2,383
- Time zone: UTC+5:45 (Nepal Time)

Mauja (Nepali: ne:मौजा) is a town and Village development committee in Kaski District in the Gandaki Zone of northern-central Nepal. Most of the people lived in villages. A village was also called "Mauja". The chief of the village was the Patil. He used to try to bring maximum land under cultivation. When there was any dispute in the village, the Patil used to settle it amicably. A Kulkarni helped the Patil in his work. The Kulkarni kept the record of the revenue that was collected. There were various artisans in the village. They had hereditary rights regarding their occupation. The tenants gave a share of their agricultural produce to the artisans for the services they rendered to the village community. This share was known as baluta. The land was cultivated by tenants.

== See also ==
- Mouza
