= Rupa Rural Municipality =

Rural municipality in Gandaki Province, Nepal

Rupa Rural Municipality रुपा गाउँपालिका
- Gaunpalika
- Location in Nepal Rupa Rural Municipality (Nepal)
- Coordinates: 28.152586°N 84.150477°E
- Country: Nepal
- Province: Gandaki
- District: Kaski District

Area
  - Total: 94.8 km^{2} (36.6 sq mi)

Population
  - Total: 14,526
  - Density: 153/km^{2} (397/sq mi)
- Time zone: UTC+5:45 (Nepal Time)
- Website: https://rupamun.gov.np/

Rupa Rural Municipality (Rupa Gaupalika) (Nepali: रुपा गाउँपालिका) is a Gaunpalika in Kaski District in Gandaki Province of Nepal. On 12 March 2017, the government of Nepal implemented a new local administrative structure, in which VDCs have been replaced with municipal and Village Councils. Rupa is one of these 753 local units.

== Demographics ==
At the time of the 2011 Nepal census, Rupa Rural Municipality had a population of 14,526. Of these, 76.7% spoke Nepali, 13.4% Gurung, 4.0% Newar, 3.2% Urdu, 2.0% Magar, 0.2% Bhojpuri, 0.1% Tamang and 0.4% other languages as their first language.

In terms of ethnicity/caste, 25.8% were Hill Brahmin, 14.6% Gurung, 11.6% Chhetri, 9.4% Kami, 6.9% Newar, 6.1% Magar, 5.4% Damai/Dholi, 4.4% Thakuri, 4.3% Kumal, 3.9% Sarki, 3.3% Musalman, 2.1% Gharti/Bhujel, 0.5% Sanyasi/Dasnami, 0.3% Khawas, 0.2% Bote, 0.2% other Dalit, 0.2% Tamang, 0.1% Badi, 0.1% Dura, 0.1% Rai and 0.3% others.

In terms of religion, 86.4% were Hindu, 9.8% Buddhist, 3.3% Muslim, 0.3% Christian and 0.1% others.

In terms of literacy, 75.1% could both read and write, 2.0% could only read and 22.8% could neither read nor write.
