= Saimarang =

Town in central Nepal

Saimarang सैमराङ्ग
- Village Development Committee
- Location in Nepal Saimarang (Nepal)
- Coordinates: 28.26°N 84.13°E
- Country: Nepal
- Zone: Gandaki Zone
- District: Kaski District

Population (1991)
  - Total: 1,851
- Time zone: UTC+5:45 (Nepal Time)

Saimarang is a town and Village Development Committee in Kaski District in the Gandaki Province of Western Nepal. At the time of the 2011 Nepal census it had a population of 1,171 persons living in 309 individual households. Saimarang owns a famous Temple Bhagawati Temple and hill known as Lamtari there is a famous Devi tample called Lamtari Mai which is in front of Pokhara Valley. The Annapurna Himalayan range can be seen at the back of the village, and Begnash, Rupa and Fewa lake in the front. Also there are several adventures such as caves, rocky hills. Local people in Warchowk and Togi are working hard to make the Saimarang VDC a good place for Adventurous Tourism. The people there are very helpful.

== Togi ==
Togi is a small Village located in Ward No. 3 of Saimarang Village Development Committee of Kaski District. Togi is about 21 km from the city Pokhara. There is a beautiful hill called Lamtary which is the head of the Togi village. Togi lies 1400 m above sea level and is located at approx. 29°N, 83°E. There are 51 houses and 150 people. Many of them are farmers. There is a Lamtari Youth club of comprising youths They are working very hard in unified ways at village.
