= Begna =

Begna may refer to:

== Places ==
- Begna, Ethiopia, a village in the Oromia Region of Ethiopia
- Begna, Norway, a village in Sør-Aurdal municipality in Innlandet county, Norway
- Begna (river), a river in Innlandet county, Norway

== See also ==
- Begnas
