= Begnas =

Coordinates: 28°10′N 84°07′E

Begnas बेगनास Website developed by Dharmaraj Thapa
- Village Development Committee
- Location in Nepal Begnas (Nepal)
- Country: Nepal
- Zone: Gandaki Zone
- District: Kaski District
- Time zone: UTC+5:45 (Nepal Time)
- Website: www.begnasonline.com

Begnas is a town and Village Development Committee in Kaski District in the Gandaki Zone of northern-central Nepal. At the 1991 Nepal census, Begnas had a population of 6,803 in 1,420 individual households.
