= Annapurna Rural Municipality, Kaski =

Annapurna Rural Municipality अन्नपूर्ण गाउँपालिका
- Gaunpalika
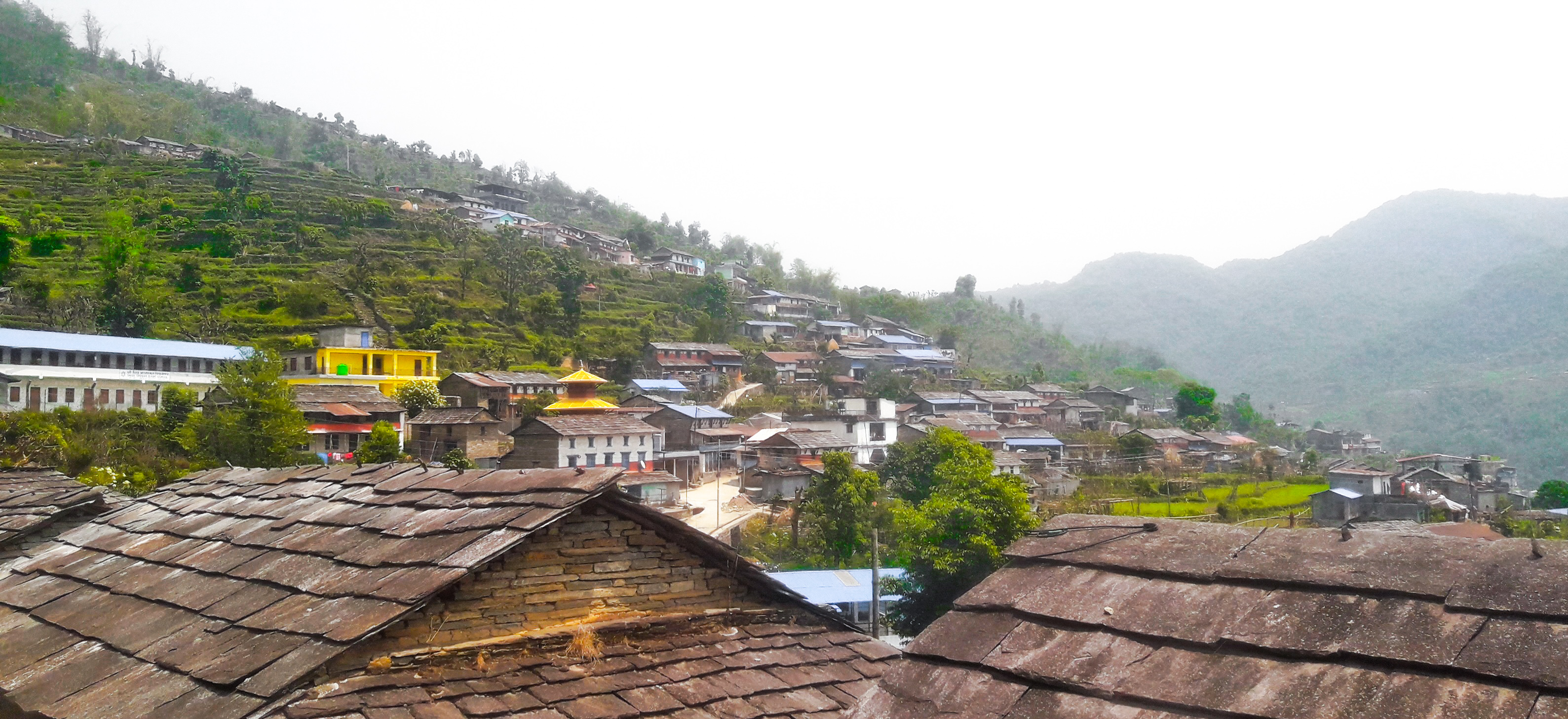
- Lumle village of Annapurna Rural Municipality

- Location in Nepal
- Coordinates: 28.283118°N 83.855864°E
- Country: Nepal
- Province: Gandaki
- District: Kaski District

Area
  - Total: 417.74 km^{2} (161.29 sq mi)

Population
  - Total: 23,417
  - Density: 56.056/km^{2} (145.19/sq mi)
- Time zone: UTC+5:45 (Nepal Time)
- Website: annapurnamunkaski.gov.np

Annapurna Rural Municipality, Kaski (Nepali : अन्नपूर्ण गाउँपालिका) is a Gaunpalika in Kaski District in Gandaki Province of Nepal named after the Annapurna Mountain. On 12 March 2017, the Government of Nepal implemented a new local administrative structure. With the implementation of the new local administrative structure, VDSs have been replaced with municipal and village councils. Annapurna Gaupalika is one of these 753 local units.

== History ==
Annapurna Rural Municipality was incorporated by merging Dhikurpokhari, Lumle, Salyan, Bhadaure Tamagi, Dangsing and Ghandruk Village Development Committees (VDCs). This rural municipality came into existence on 10 March 2017.

== Location ==
Annapurna Rural Municipality is surrounded by Machhapuchchhre Rural Municipality on the east, Myagdi district on the west, Manang District on the north and Parbat district and Pokhara Metropolitan City on the south with a total area of 417.74 km2 (161.29 sq mi) and the total population of 23,565 individuals according to Nepal census 2011 (2068 BS). The population density of this Rural Municipality is 56.411/km2 (146.103/sq mi). This rural municipality is divided into 11 wards. This rural municipality lies 4528 feet above sea level.

The Mid-Hill Highway (Pokhara-Baglung Segment) goes through the center of this gaupalika.

== Demographics ==
At the time of the 2011 Nepal census, Annapurna Rural Municipality had a population of 23,565. Of these, 82.7% spoke Nepali, 15.1% Gurung, 1.0% Magar, 0.3% Rai, 0.2% Tamang, 0.2% Urdu, 0.1% Kulung, 0.1% Newar, 0.1% Thakali and 0.2% other languages as their first language.

In terms of ethnicity/caste, 28.9% were Hill Brahmin, 20.8% Kami, 17.8% Gurung, 8.6% Chhetri, 7.1% Magar, 5.7% Damai/Dholi, 4.5% Sarki, 1.0% Gharti/Bhujel, 0.8% other Dalit, 0.8% Rai, 0.7% Sanyasi/Dasnami, 0.6% Tamang, 0.6% Thakali, 0.5% Newar, 0.4% Badi, 0.4% Thakuri, 0.3 Musalman, 0.1% Ghale, 0.1% Sherpa, 0.1% Sonar, 0.1% other Terai and 0.2% others.

In terms of religion, 83.1% were Hindu, 13.5% Buddhist, 1.6% Bon, 0.8% Christian, 0.3% Muslim, 0.1% Kirati and 0.5% others.

In terms of literacy, 70.3% could both read and write, 2.8% could read but not write and 26.8% could neither read nor write.

== Economic activities ==
The major economic sources of this gaupalika are:

- Tourism

The major places for tourist attraction of this gaupalika are Lumle, Machhapuchhre & Annapurna Base Camp, Ghodepani, Ghandruk, Panchase, Isaru, Hidden Lake, and Nasikhark.

- Agriculture

People do agriculture as their prime source of income. Nowadays people are using modern technology for doing agriculture.

- Animal husbandry

People in this gaupalika rear animals like cows, buffalo, yaks and goats for milk; and buffalo, sheep, goats and pigs for meat.

- Poultry farming

There are many poultry farms in the southern part of this gaupalika where different types are poultry are rearing like broiler, Lear's and local fowl.

- Horticulture

People in this gaupalika plant oranges, pears, apple etc. for their cash crops.

== Major markets ==
The main market area of this gaupalika are:

- Naudanda
- Kande
- Nayapul
- Birethanti
- Syauli Bazar
