= Dangsing, Gadaki =

Dangsing दाङसिङ
- Village Development Committee
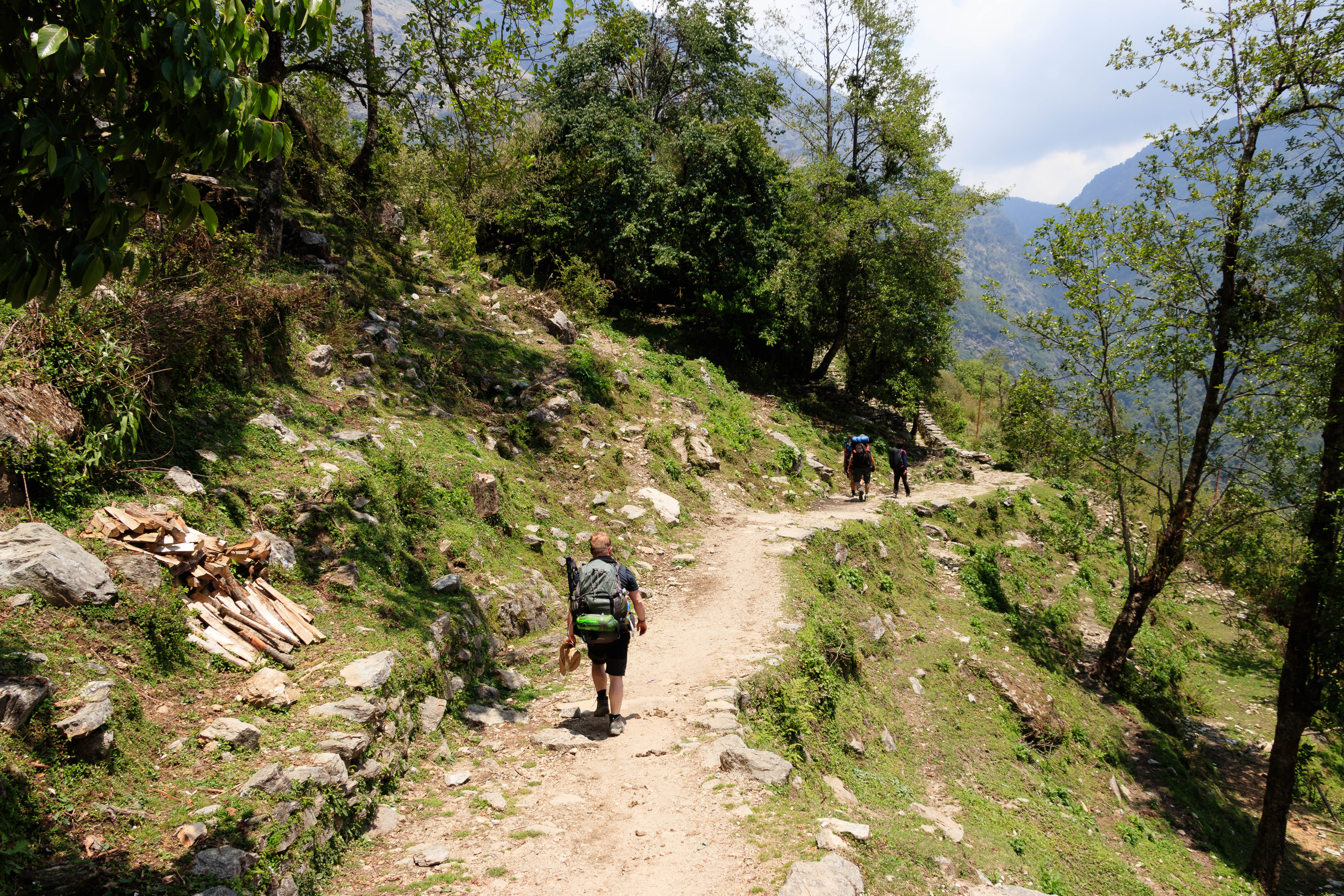

- Location in Nepal Dangsing (Nepal)
- Coordinates: 28.36°N 83.75°E
- Country: Nepal
- Zone: Gandaki Zone
- District: Kaski District

Population (1991)
  - Total: 3,533
- Time zone: UTC+5:45 (Nepal Time)

Dangsing is a town and Village Development Committee in Kaski District in the Gandaki Zone of northern-central Nepal. At the 1991 Nepal census, it had a population of 3,533 persons in 794 individual households.

Dangsing

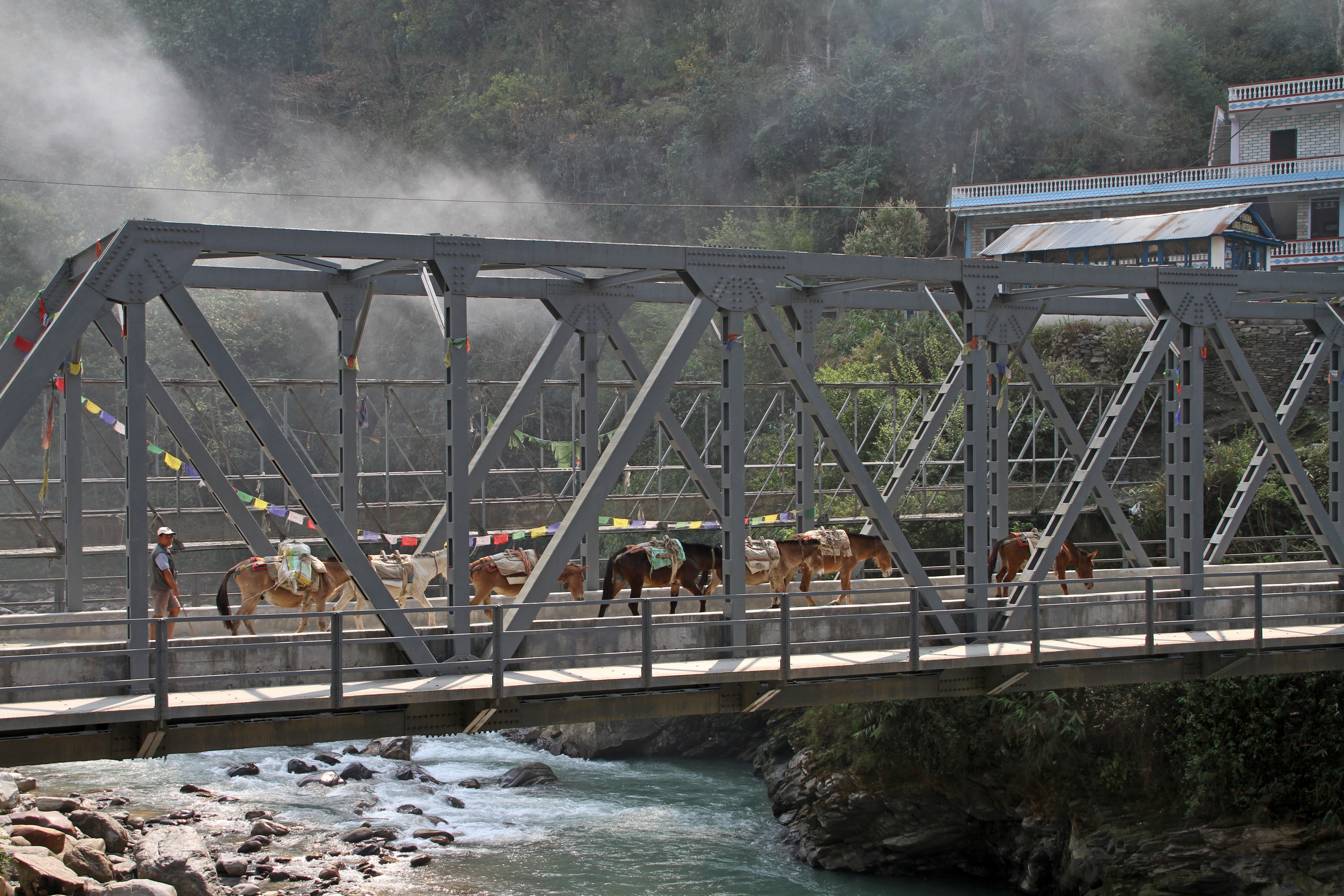
Bridge over Modi Khola

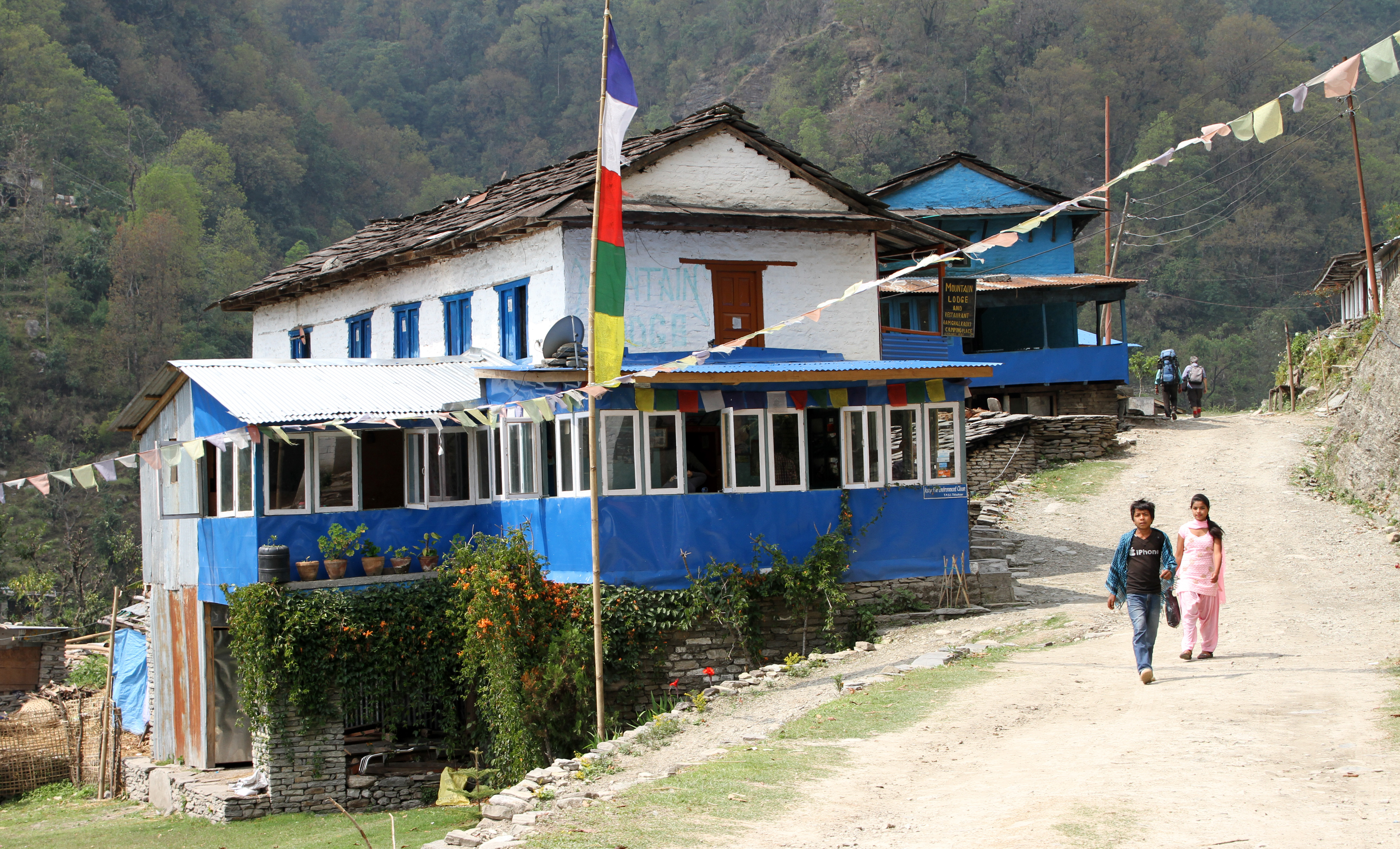
Lodge between Birethanti and Hille

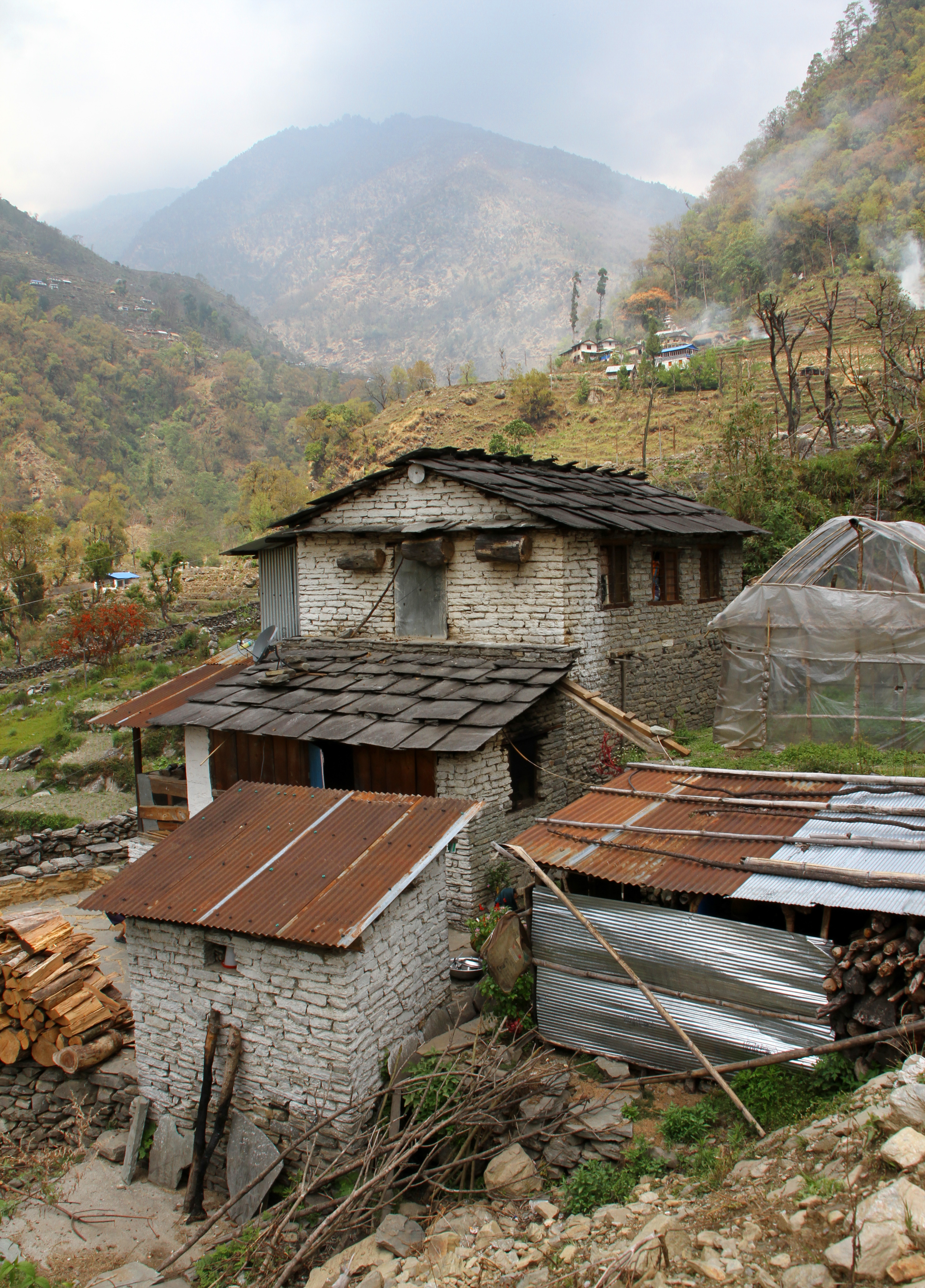
House with beehives

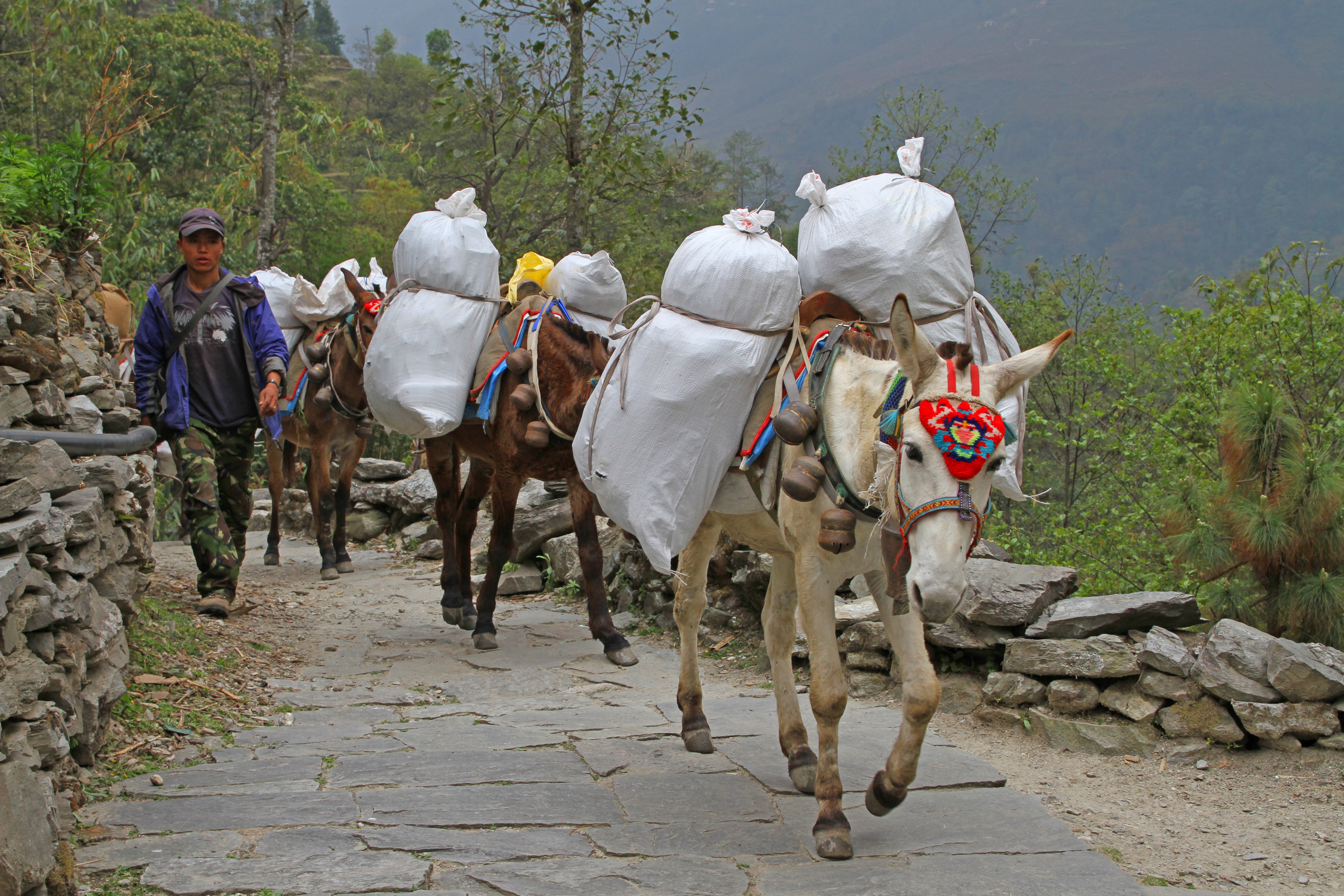
Thikedhunga, mules

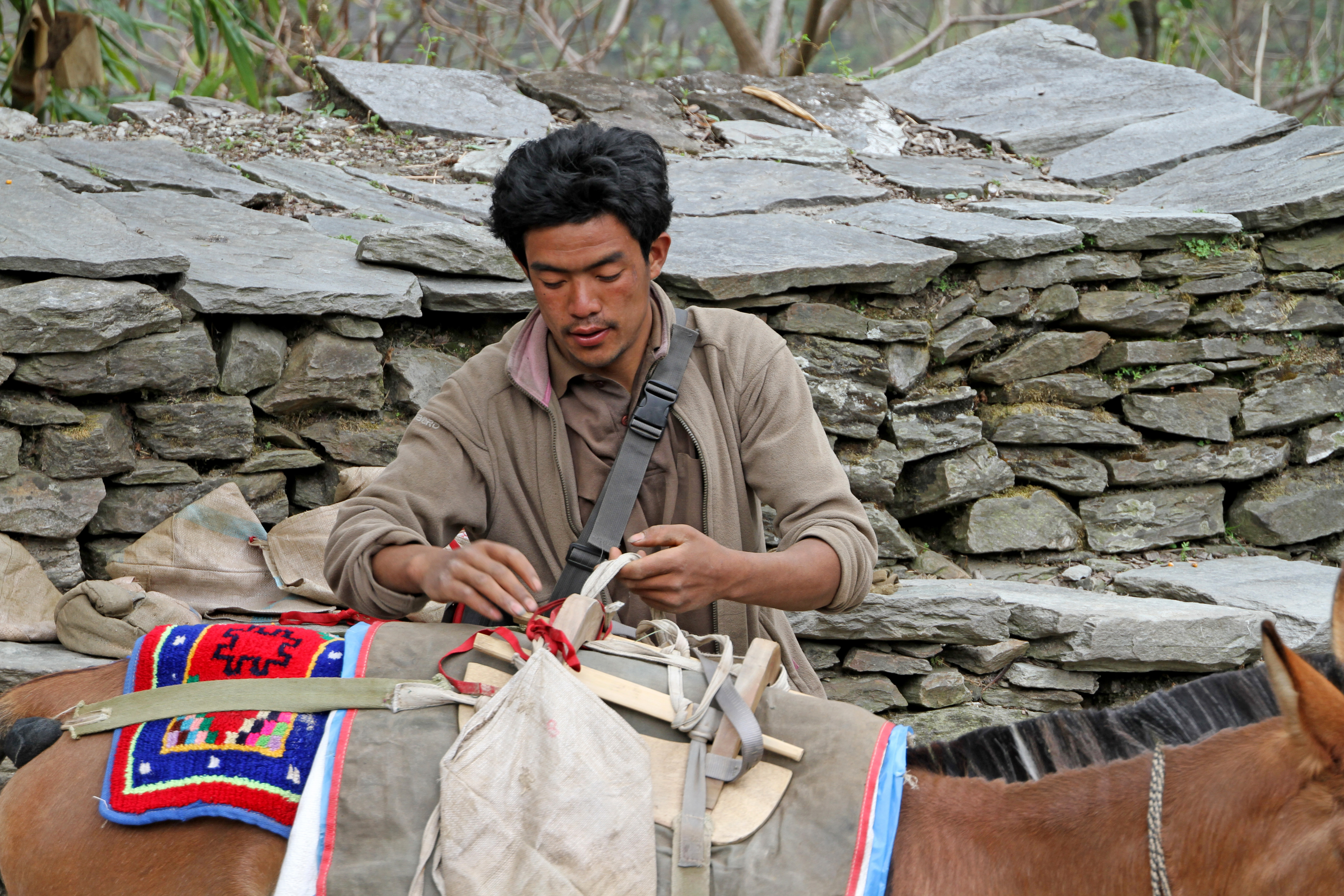
Thikedhunga, muleteer

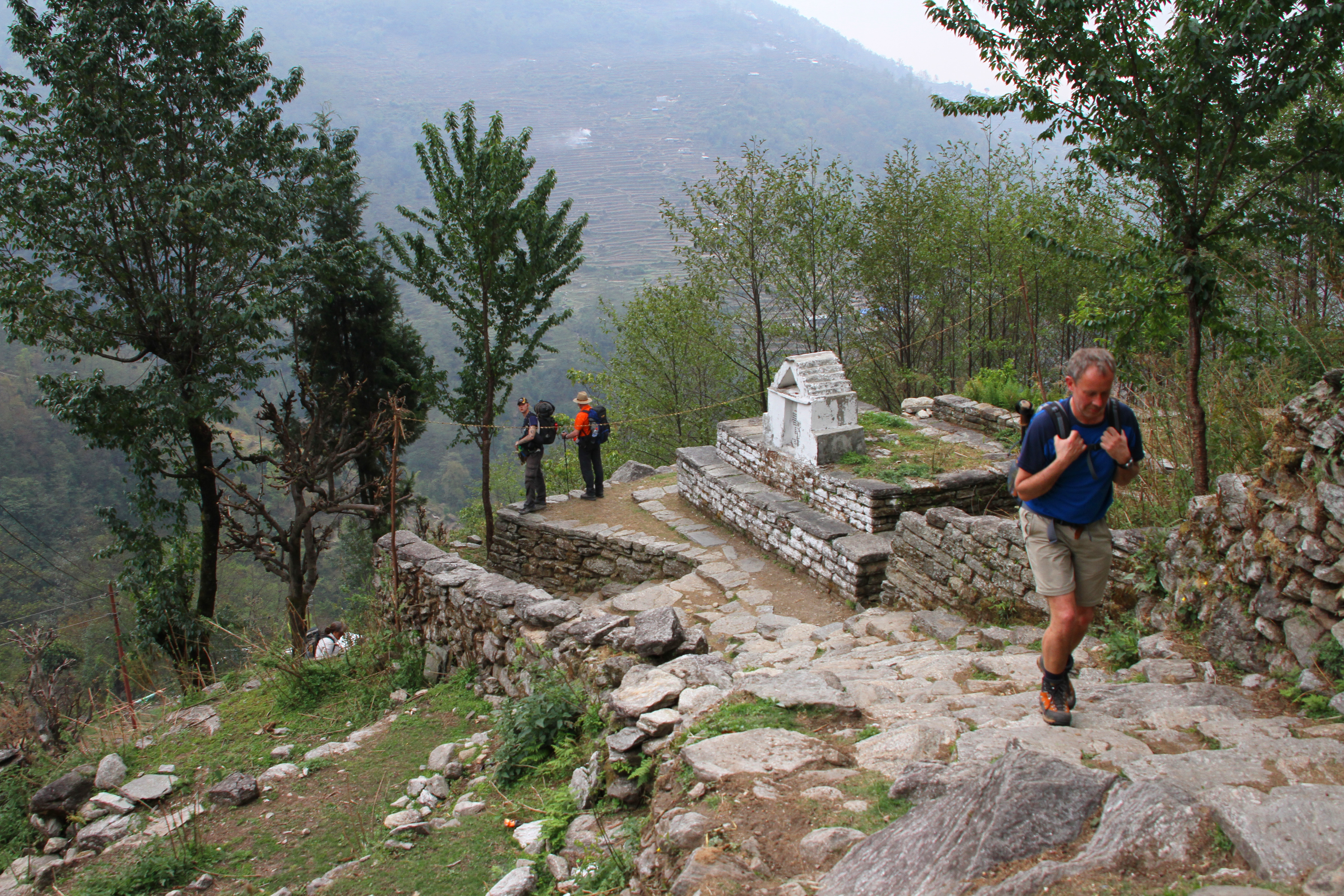
Stairway to Ulleri

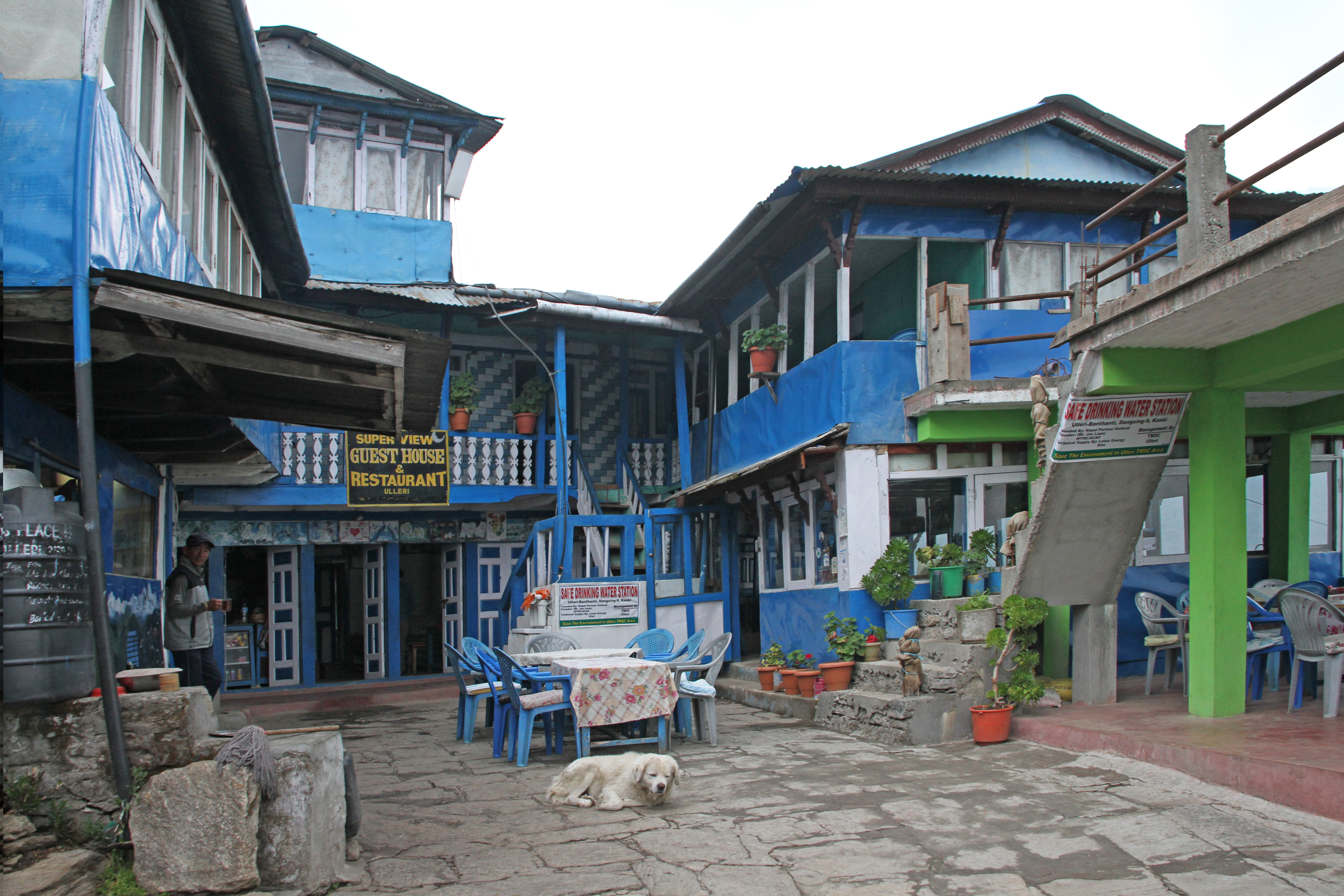
Guest house in Ulleri

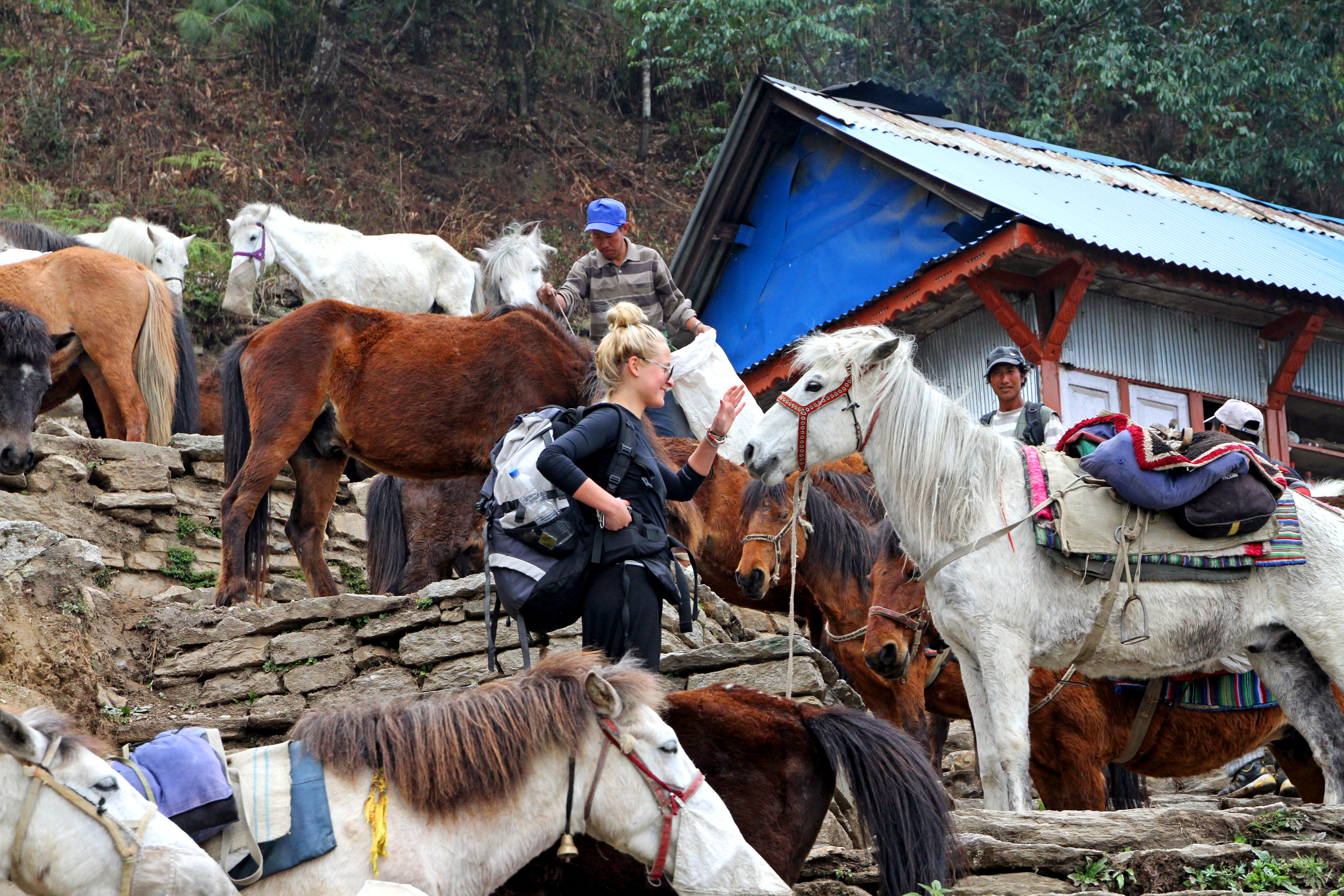
Horses in Ulleri
