= Chapakot, Kaski =

Coordinates: 28°13′N 83°54′E

Chapakot चापाकोट
- Village Development Committee
- Location in Nepal Chapakot (Nepal)
- Country: Nepal
- Zone: Gandaki Zone
- District: Kaski District

Population (1991)
  - Total: 2,966
- Time zone: UTC+5:45 (Nepal Time)
- Postal code: 33709
- Area code: 061

Chapakot is a village and Village Development Committee in Kaski District in the Gandaki Zone of northern-central Nepal. As of the 2011 census, it recorded a population of 22 969, marking a significant increase from the 1991 Nepal census, which reported a population of 2,966 residents in 574 individual households.
