= Kahun, Nepal =

Kahun, Nepal काहुँ Kahundada
- Subdivision of Pokhara
- Location in Nepal Kahun, Nepal (Nepal)
- Coordinates: 28.23°N 84.01°E
- Country: Nepal
- Zone: Gandaki Zone
- District: Kaski District

Population (2011)
  - Total: 14,716
- Time zone: UTC+5:45 (Nepal Time)

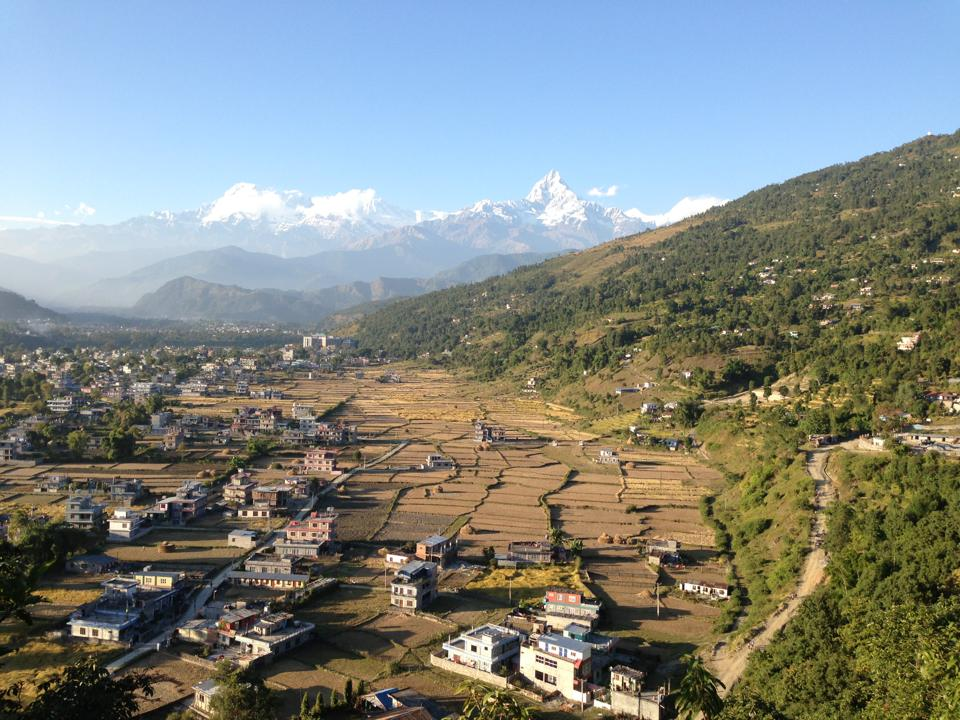
Kahun

Kahun is a former village and Village Development Committee in Kaski District in the Gandaki Zone of northern-central Nepal. In 2015, it was annexed to Pokhara. At the time of the 2011 Nepal census it had a population of 14,716.

== Major attractions ==
=== Kahun Danda ===
Kahun hill is located about 7 km from the city centre Mahendrapul via Matepani Gumba with the altitude of 1414 m. The hilltop is situated north-east of Pokhara valley. The Kahun Darahara (view tower), which was built in the year 2026 B.S., is the main attraction of Kahun hill. The entrance charge to enter Kahun Darahara is Rs. 20 per person. From the view tower, Mt. Manaslu, Mt. Annapurna, Mt. Dhaulagiri, Mt. Machhapuchre, and the wider Pokhara valley are visible. There is a beautiful Gurung village in the southern part of Kahun hill and the rest is covered with dense forest.

=== Buddha Statue ===
Recently an organization called Dharmakaya Buddha Mandala Development and Management committee has launched a new project in Kauhn. The organization is constructing a big Buddha statue in Kahun Danda to promote tourism.

This huge Buddha Mandala is a five-year plan. The state government has given a grant of Rs 4 million at the rate of Rs 2 million to Rs 2 million in the last two fiscal years. Prem Lama, a member of the Dharmakaya Buddha Mandala Development and Management Committee, said, “The remaining 20 million rupees has been spent on the retaining wall with the remaining 2 million rupees from the state government.” He said that Rs. 3.2 million has been allocated in partnership from Pokhara Metropolitan City.
