= Kaski District =

Coordinates: 28°20′N 84°00′E

Kaski District कास्की जिल्ला
- District
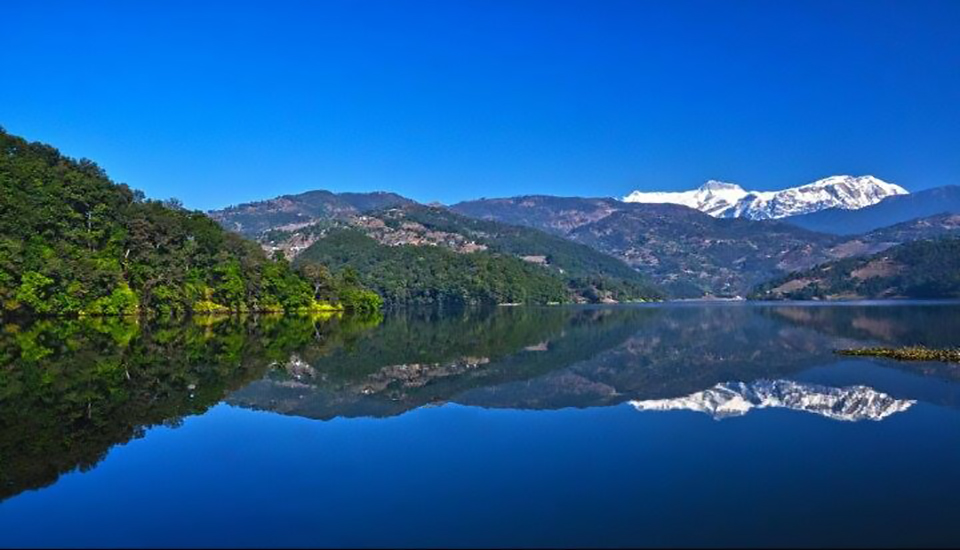
- Begnas Lake
- Interactive map of Kaski District
- Country: Nepal
- Province: Gandaki Province
- Admin HQ.: Pokhara

Government
  - Type: Coordination committee
  - Body: DCC, Kaski
  - Chief District Officer (CDO): Rudra Dewi Sharma

Area
  - Total: 2,017 km^{2} (779 sq mi)

Population (2011)
  - Total: 492,098
  - Density: 244.0/km^{2} (631.9/sq mi)
- Time zone: UTC+05:45 (NPT)
- Telephone Code: 061
- Vehicle registration: GA-
- Website: www.ddckaski.gov.np/

Kaski District (Nepali: कास्की जिल्ला, [kaski]), a part of Gandaki Province, is one of the seventy-seven districts of Nepal. The name is disambiguated from Kaskikot, the ancient Kaski Kingdom.

The district, with Pokhara as its district headquarter, covers an area of 2,017 square km and had a total population of 492,098 according to 2011 Census. This district lies at the centroid point of the country. The altitude of Kaski district ranges from 450 meters the lowest land to 8091 meters the highest point in the Himalaya range. Kaski District politically has One Metropolitan City, 4 Gaupalika and 3 electoral sectors.

The district covers parts of the Annapurna mountain range, and the picturesque scene of the mountains can be observed from most parts of the district. It is one of the best tourist destinations of Nepal. The district is full of rivers such as Seti Gandaki, Modi and Madi along with other rivulets. The district headquarters Pokhara lies about 750 m above the sea level. The district is known for the Himalayan range with about 11 Himalayas with height greater than 7000 m. The nearby peaks include Machhapuchhre (Virgin Peak - 6993m). The Annapurna Range in the northern side is always full of snow. The scenery of northern mountains, gorge of Seti River, Davis Falls, natural caves, Fewa Lake, Begnas Lake and Rupa Lake are both natural resources and tourist attractions.

== Etymology ==
Regarding Booring the origin of the name Kaski, there are many hypotheses; among them:

- from Khās; Cas; Kas: Caus, referring to the Khās Rulers.
- from Kashyap Rishi who spent his time in Kaskikot making ayurvedic grantha "Kashyap Sagita";
- from koshkash, meaning a place with natural mineral resources;
- from kacchad, a Nepali style of dress;
- from Kashikot, the central part of Kaski.

== History ==
In the early 1800s, the capital of Kaski was Batulechaur and that Sarangkot was a town with a fort.

== Politics ==
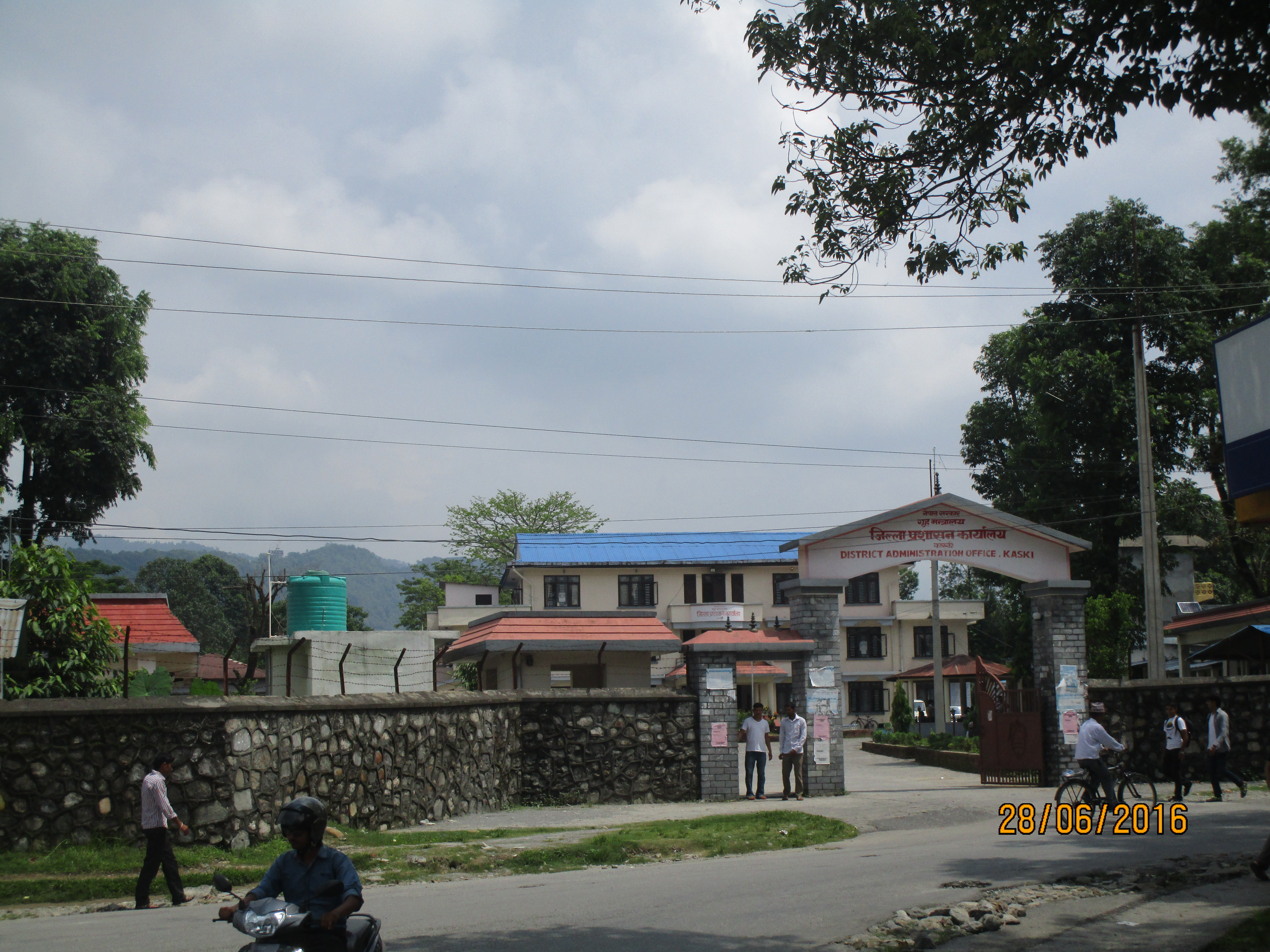
Kaski District Administrative office

All the governance and development of Kaski District are handled mainly by District Development Committee Kaski (DDC-Kaski).

== Culture ==
The district is full of people with multi-language, multi-religion and multiple cultures. Different people have different foods, dresses and norms based on their caste and religion. Many places offer Home Stay for internal as well as international tourists along with performance of local dance according to caste and cultures. According to the census of 2068 Kaski district has people of about 84 castes, 44 languages and 11 religions. The dressing style of people here matches with national dress. The main foods of people here are Dal-Bhat Tarkari, Roti, and Dhindo (These are typical Nepalese foods). The district is the common place of different castes such as Magars, Gurung, Brahmin, Chhetri, Newar, Thakali, Kumal and many more.

== Sports ==
According to the District Sport Committee, Kaski District has one stadium, named Pokhara Rangashala, of about 417 Ropani of area and capacity of 21,000 spectators. Kaski has its reputation in generating sportsmen in the country.

== Education ==
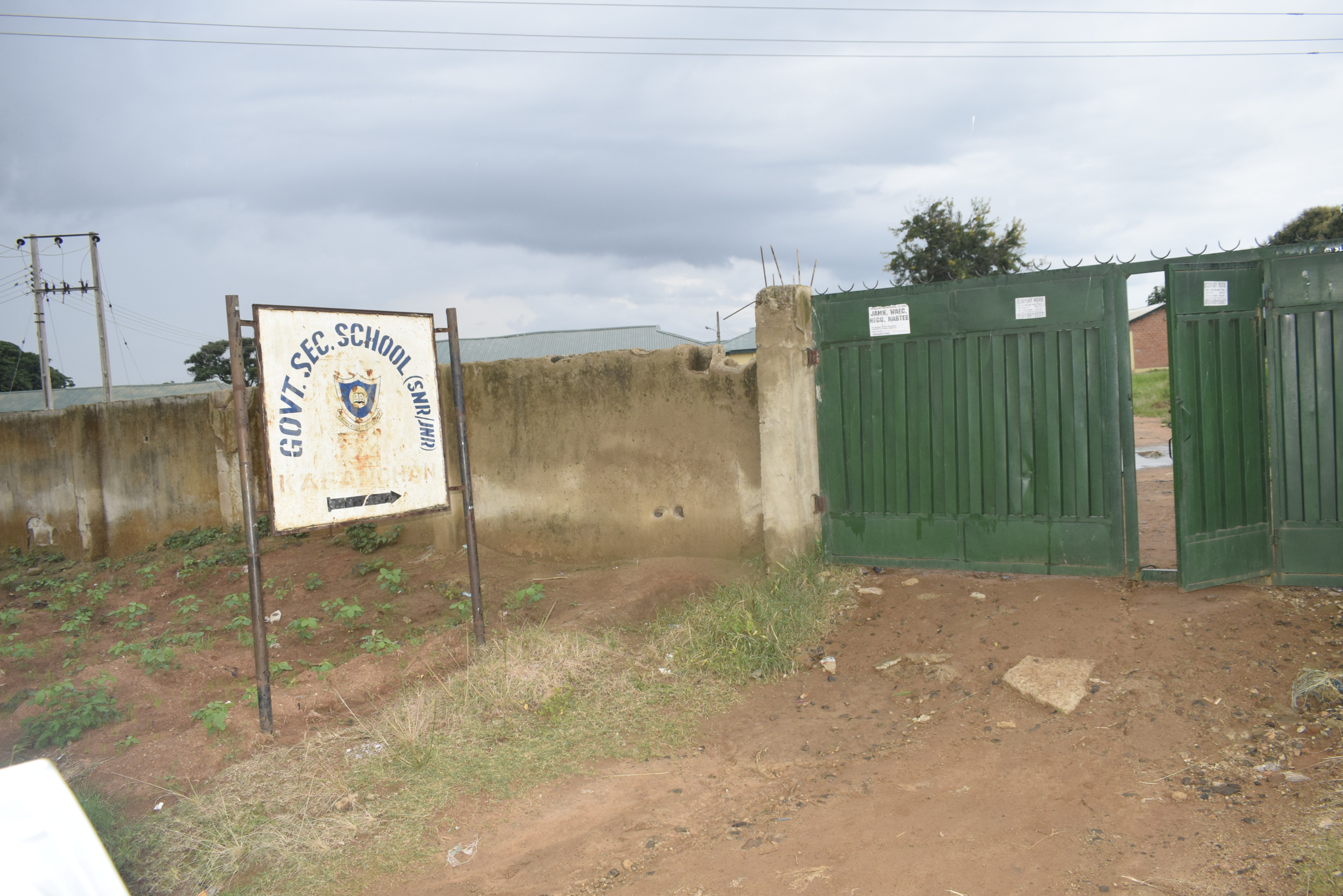
The entrance of Shree Tribhuvan Shanti Model Secondary School

The major school in the district is Shree Tribhuvan Shanti Model Secondary School.

== Tourism ==
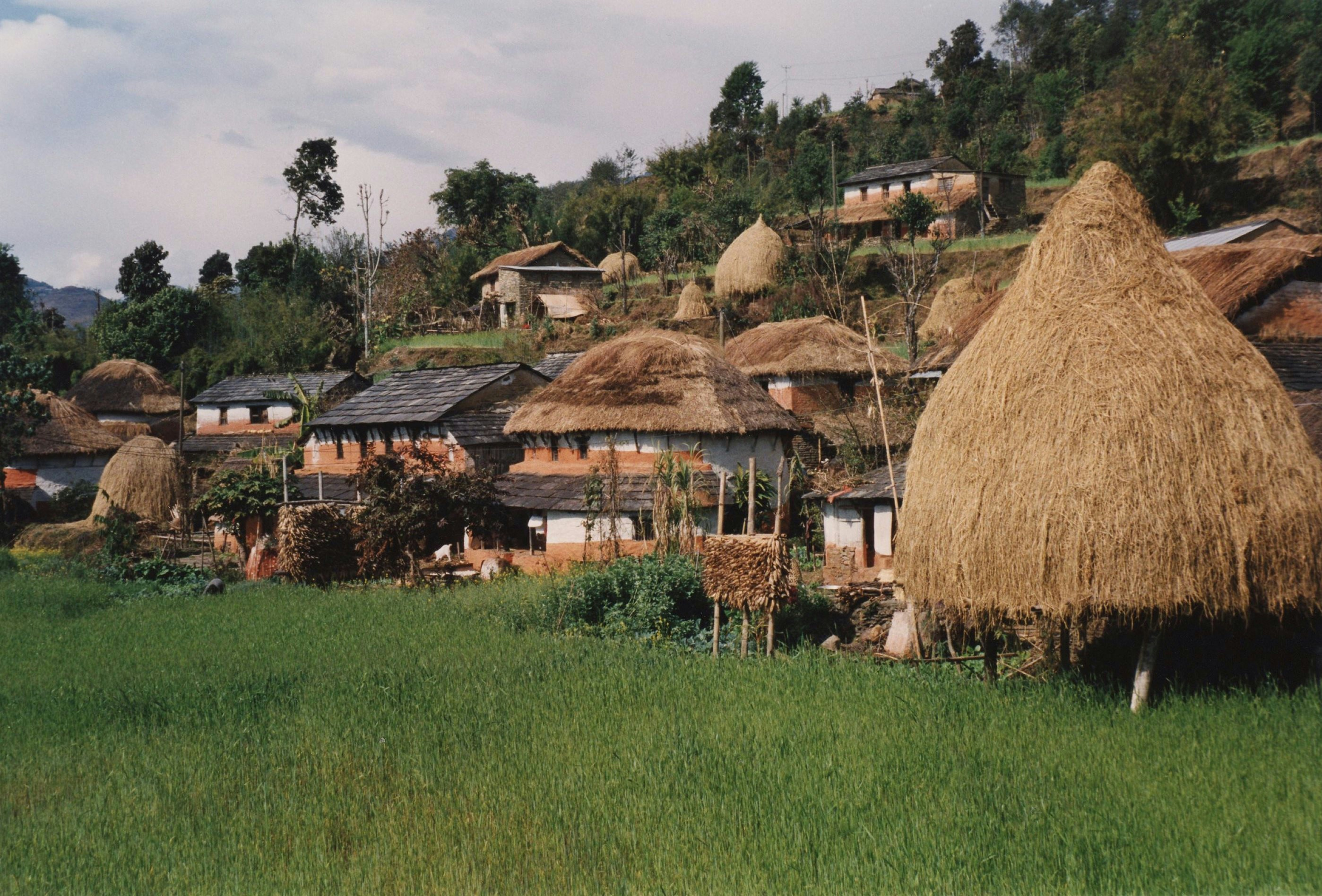
Simpali, a village in Annapurna Rural Municipality circa 1990 AD

Annapurna Cable Car, Pokhara

- Phewa Lake is a tourism destination in Nepal and the second biggest lake of Nepal with the area of 4.43 square km and a perimeter of 18 km (11 mi). Boating is possible in Phewa Lake and takes in the surrounding forest and settlements near it. The Tal Barahi temple is also situated at the middle of the lake.
- Begnas Lake, at Lekhnath of Kaski district, is the third big lake of Nepal with the area of 3.73 square km. The lake is known for its pure water compared with other lakes and the view of Annapurna and Machhapuchhre.
- Rupa Lake
- Patale Chhango or Davis Falls: water falls located at Chorepatan-Pokhara.
- Gupteshwor Mahadev Cave at Chorepatan-Pokhara is a religious and tourism destination.
- Mahendra Cave at Bataulechaur has length of about 125 m. It has different images of Lord Shiva and Lord Ganesh and others that are natural.
- Planeterium at Bataulechaur is a tourist location with different attractions, such as a planetarium, science center, mirror maze, and mystery house.
- Seti River flows from Machhapuchhre Peak through gorges with the depth of about 200 feet.
- Bindhabasini Temple is one of the most important religious destination of Nepal. Different Himalayas can be seen from this temple.
- Sarangkot is known for views of the sunrise, sunset, views of Pokhara city and Paragliding. It is located at about 5500 feet.
- Machhapuchhre is a mountain 6997m in height, known for its fish-tail structure. The peak is still not open for mountaineers.
- The Annapurna Range, on the border between Manang and Myagdi Districts, is seen from almost all places of Kaski district.
- Panchase Chhetra is an area of about 5500 hectares including five peaks (Panchadham) and the sources of the rivers Harpan, Rati, Jare, Aandhi, Seti. This region lies in the border of Kaski, Parbat and Syangja district. Many Himalayas can be seen from this place. This is the place with many Sunakhari; you can find about 113 different types of Sungava. The region is known for its biodiversity, featuring Lali Gurans, Kharshu, Chap, Chandan and many more of about 600 types and also the place for different animals such as tiger, bear, deer.
- Bat Cave (Chameri Gufa in Nepali language) is a solutional cave, which has a habitat of Horseshoe bats over the walls and ceiling. Formed of limestone, it is a show cave and one of the most visited tourist destinations in Pokhara. The cave has one entrance and one exit. The exit is narrower than the entrance and needs climbing. The indigenous belief is that only those who have not sinned should pass the exit hole. The cave is surrounded by forest. It is close to the nearby Mahendra Cave. The cave is U-shaped and inside the cave are carvings of Hindu deities.
- Dhampus village: Dhampus is a village and Village Development Committee in Kaski District in the Gandaki Province of northern-central Nepal. At the time of the 1991 Nepal census, it had a population of 2,753 persons living in 547 individual households. It is gradually turning into a tourist destination. It has the Australian Base Camp with views of the peaks Annapurna, Dhaulagiri and Machhapuchhre.
- Astam Village is a village of Dhital, one of the wards of Machhapuchhre Rural Municipality of Kaski. It provides a panoramic view of Annapurna and Machhapuchhre range. The range of Mardi Trek starts from Kande and Australian camp, Deurali, Forest-Camp, Rest Camp, Low Camp, Badal Danda, High Camp, Viewpoint and BaseCamp.

== Geography and climate ==
Climate Zone	Elevation Range	% of Area
Upper Tropical	300 to 1,000 meters 1,000 to 3,300 ft.	18.6%
Subtropical	1,000 to 2,000 meters 3,300 to 6,600 ft.	29.4%
Temperate	2,000 to 3,000 meters 6,400 to 9,800 ft.	16.6%
Subalpine	3,000 to 4,000 meters 9,800 to 13,100 ft.	12.1%
Alpine	4,000 to 5,000 meters 13,100 to 16,400 ft.	14.8%
Nival	above 5,000 meters	7.4%
Trans-Himalayan	3,000 to 6,400 meters 9,800 to 21,000 ft.	0.6%

== Demographics ==
Historical population
Census year	Pop.	±% p.a.
1981	221,272	—
1991	292,945	+2.85%
2001	380,527	+2.65%
2011	492,098	+2.60%
2021	600,051	+2.00%
Source: Citypopulation

At the time of the 2021 Nepal census, Kaski District had a population of 600,051. 6.20% of the population is under 5 years of age. It has a literacy rate of 87.73% and a sex ratio of 1049 females per 1000 males. 513,504 (85.58%) lived in municipalities.

Castes/ethnic groups in Kaski district (2021)
1. Bahun (26.4%)
2. Gurung (15.4%)
3. Chhetri (14.4%)
4. Magar (9.74%)
5. Kami (9.07%)
6. Newar (4.28%)
7. Damai (3.93%)
8. Sarki (3.60%)
9. Tamang (2.68%)
10. Thakuri (1.53%)
11. Bhujel (1.17%)
12. Other Hill Janjati (3.58%)
13. Others (4.26%)

Khas people make up 60% of the population, of which Brahmins are the largest ethnicity. Khas Dalits are 17% of the population. Hill Janjatis are 33% of the population, mainly Gurung and Magar. Newars are 4% of the population, and foreigners (mainly in Pokhara city) are 1% of the population.

Languages of Kaski district (2021)
1. Nepali (77.7%)
2. Gurung (11.1%)
3. Magar (3.92%)
4. Nepal Bhasha (1.91%)
5. Tamang (1.50%)
6. Others (3.86%)

At the time of the 2021 census, 77.67% of the population spoke Nepali, 11.14% Gurung, 3.92% Magar, 1.91% Nepal Bhasha and 1.50% Tamang as their first language. In 2011, 78.5% of the population spoke Nepali as their first language.

Religion in Kaski District (2021)
Religion	Percent
Hinduism	81.11%
Buddhism	12.44%
Bon	2.56%
Christianity	2.34%
Islam	1.04%
Other or not stated	0.51%

== Administration ==
The district consists of one metropolitan city and four rural municipalities. These are as follows:

- Pokhara Metropolitan City
- Annapurna Rural Municipality
- Machhapuchchhre Rural Municipality
- Madi Rural Municipality
- Rupa Rural Municipality

=== Former Municipalities and Village Development Committees ===
- Arba Vijaya
- Armala (Nghola)
- Begnas
- Bhachok
- Bhadaure Tamagi
- Bhalam
- Bharat Pokhari
- Chapakot
- Dangsing (T'uhsi)
- Deurali
- Dhampus (Toh'mle)
- Dhikur Pokhari
- Dhital
- Ghachok (Kazo)
- Ghandruk (Koh'da)
- Hansapur
- Hemja
- Kahun
- Kalika
- Kaskikot (Kas-khi ko'i)
- Kristinachnechaur
- Lahachok (LaZo)
- Lamachaur, Pokhara
- Lekhnath Municipality
- Lumle (Lhu'le)
- Lwangghale (Lahwaa-Kahli)
- Machhapuchchhre (Kata'shu)
- Majhthana
- Mala
- Mauja (Mhuja)
- Mijuredanda
- Namarjung (Namju)
- Nirmalpokhari
- Parche (Paje)
- Pokhara Metropolitan City
- Pumdibhumdi
- Puranchaur
- Rakhi
- Ribhan (R'hamay)
- Rupakot (Rup ko'i)
- Saimarang
- Salyan
- Sarangkot
- Sardikhola
- Shisuwa
- Siddha
- Sildujure
- Thumakodada (also known as Tarkang)
- Thumki

The Village Development Committee (VDC) was dissolved on 10 March 2017 to be replaced by the Gaunpalika. So, there are no VDCs in this current time.

== See also ==
- Provinces of Nepal
