= List of lakes of Nepal =

The largest lake in Nepal is Rara Lake, also known as Mahendra Daha, in Karnali Province. It lies at about 3200m above sea level, and has a total area of 10.4 square kilometres (4.0 sq mi). It is also the deepest lake in Nepal, having a depth of 167 m. Tilicho Lake in Gandaki Province is the highest lake in Nepal. It lies at an altitude of 4919 m above mean sea level. Other most popular lakes are Phewa lake and Begnas Lake located in Pokhara. Below is a list of artificial and natural lakes in Nepal ordered by province, and by district within each province.

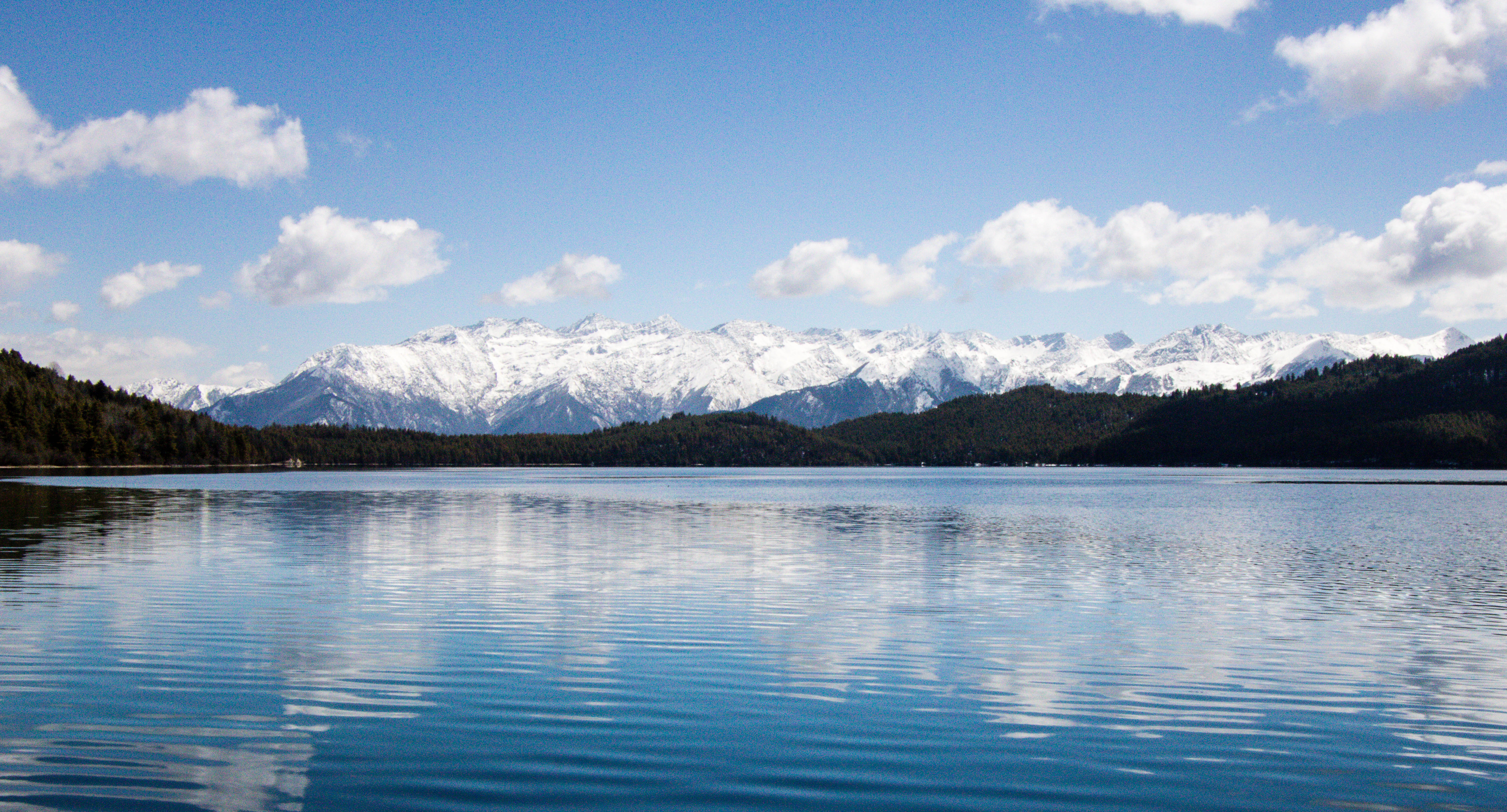
Rara Lake

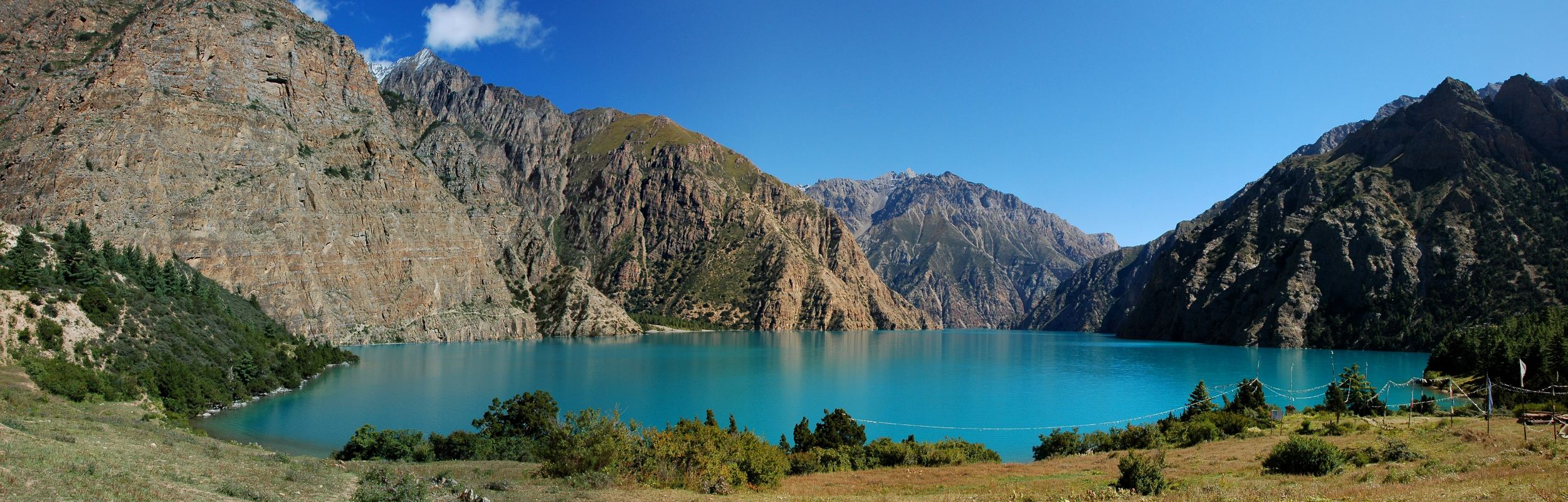
Phoksundo Lake in Nepal

== Bagmati province ==
The Bagmati Province has 222 lakes distributed across the Terai (4%), Hill (95%), and Mountain (1%) regions. Districts with the most lakes in decreasing order are Lalitpur(97), Kathmandu (58), Bhaktapur (52), Chitwan (6), Dolakaha (3), Sindhuli (2), Makwanpur (1), Nuwakot (1), Ramechhap (1) and Sindhupalchowk (1). Out of 119 Palikas in the province, Lalitpur Sub Metropolitan City in Lalitpur district has the biggest number of lakes (50) compared with other Palikas.

=== Bhaktapur district ===
- Bodegaun Ponds
- Nu Pukhu
- Siddha Pokhari

=== Chitwan district ===
- Anjana Taal
- Baikunthe Taal
- Bishazari Tal
- Chepang Taal
- Chisapani Taal
- Gaduwa taal
- Ghaila Taal
- Kasara Taal
- Khageri Dam
- Nanda Vauju taal
- Rani Pokhari
- Rhino Taal
- Tamorghaila Taal
- Tikauli Taal

=== Dhading district ===
- Ganga Jamuna Tal
- Kalo Daha
- Seto Daha

=== Dolakha district ===
- Jata Pokhari
- Shiva Pokhari
- Simpani Pokhari
- Thuli Pokhari
- Tsho Rolpa

=== Kathmandu district ===
- Gahana Pokhari
- Ikha Pokhari
- Kamal Pokhari
- Naag Pokhari
- Rani Pokhari
- Taudaha Lake

=== Lalitpur District ===
- Boje Pokhari
- Boke Daha
- Godavari Kunda
- Lagankhel Pokhari
- Naag Daha
- Pimbahal Pokhari
- Zoo Pokhari

=== Makwanpur district ===
- Kulekhani Reservoir

=== Nuwakot district ===
- Sagar Kunda
- Surya Kunda

=== Ramechhap district ===
- Pokhari Dada

=== Rasuwa district ===
- Bhairab Kund
- Goshain Kund
- Parvati Kunda
- Saraswoti Kunda
- Kalopohari
- Seto Daha
- Kalo Daha

=== Sindhuli district ===
- Kund
- Pancha Kanya

=== Sindhupalchowk district ===
- Bahula pokhari
- Panch Pokhari
- Raithaneshwori Pokhari

== Gandaki province ==
Gandaki Province has 42 lakes within an elevation of 3,000 masl, distributed across the Terai (5%), Hill (71%), and Mountain (24%) regions.

=== Baglung district ===
- Baraha Pokhari
- Gaja Daha
- Ganaune Bhuiphutta Lake

=== Gorkha district ===
- Birendra Lake
- Ghunchok Pokhari
- Kalchuman Taal
- Mahendra Taal
- Rani Pokhari
- Tal Pokhari
- Thulo Pokhari
- Narad Kund

=== Kaski district ===
- Aalaiche Pokhari
- Bage Pokhari
- Barna Pokhari
- Begnas Lake
- Dipang Lake
- Gunde Tal
- Kamal Pokhari
- Khaste Tal
- Khapuche Tal
- Maidi Tal
- Naya Pokhari
- Neureni Tal
- Phewa Tal
- Pumdi Pokhari
- Rani Pokhari
- Rupa Lake
- Sani Pokhari
- Shanti Kunda
- Siddi Pokhari
- Thulo Pokhari

=== Lamjung district ===
- Baraha Pokhari
- Damrang Pokhari
- Deurali Sano Pokhari
- Deurali Thulo Pokhari
- Ilam Pokhari
- Murunje Pokhari
- Siddi Pokhari
- Tinghare Thulo Pokhari
- Ulgera Pokhari

=== Manang district ===
- Dhumba lake
- Gangapurna Lake
- Kajin Sara
- Murchaute Lake
- Sakum Lake
- Tilicho lake
- Titi Lake

=== Myagdi district ===
- Khair Barahi Tal
- Bhale Basne Lake

=== Parbat district ===
- Patle Kharka Pokhari
- Sani Pokhari
- Thulo Pokhari

=== Syangja district ===
- Panchase Taal

=== Tanahun district ===
- Marshyangdi Reservoir

=== Nawalparasi district (former district) ===
- Amar Pokhari
- Bauliya
- Buddha Mangal Tal
- Devdaha Pokhari
- Dhanewa Pokhari
- Gaida Tal
- Hadahiya Tal
- Java Pokhari
- Kamal Pokhari
- Loharauli Pokhari
- Nandan Tal
- Pani Pokhari
- Pokhara (Jeetpur)
- Pokhara (Kushma)
- Pokhara (Patkauli)
- Pokhari (Devgaun)
- Pokhari (Pali)
- Pokhari Tal (Mahuwari)
- Purnahawa Pokhari
- Sagada Pokhari
- Sanischare lake
- Sisani Pokhari
- Swathi Pokhari
- Thulo Pokhari

== Karnali province ==
=== Dailekh district ===
- Kunya Lake

=== Dolpa district ===
- Jagadulla
- Phoksundo Lake
- Pritha Daha

=== Humla district ===
- Selim Lake

=== Jumla district ===
- Bistajyu daha
- Giri Daha
- Jumla
- Sanka Daha
- Thakurjyu Daha

=== Mugu district ===
- Dudh Tal
- Rinmokshya Pond
- Rara Lake

=== Salyan district ===
- Kachuwa Daha
- Kubinde Daha

=== Rukum west district ===
- Syarpu Lake
- Sankh pokhari
- Shital Pokhari
- Thuli Daha
- Bairi Daha

== Koshi province ==
=== Bhojpur district ===
- Chyangre Pokhari
- Haas Pokhari
- Kal Pokhari
- Manedanda Pokhari
- Nira Pokhari
- Salpa Pokhari

=== Dhankuta district ===
- Marga Pokhari
- Rani Taal

=== Ilam district ===
- Aahal Pokhari
- Antu Pokhari
- Bijay pokhari
- Dhap Pokhari
- Gore Pokhari (Seti Devi)
- Jor Pokhari
- Jhyau Pokhari
- Mai Pokhari
- Suke Pokhari
- Uttare Pokhari

=== Jhapa district ===
- Arjundhara
- Arna Khadi
- Banyani Badh
- Dadagaun Badh
- Deunia Khadi
- Devi Paini
- Dhamala Badh
- Dhanusha Pokhari
- Dudamari Badh (I)
- Dudamari Badh (II) Kunwar Tol
- Indreni Tal
- Jamunkhadi
- Katahare Badh
- Kechana Rani Pokhari
- Lajeko Badh
- Lahure Badh
- Mahadev Than Badh
- Pagari Badh
- Pathriya Khadi

=== Khotang district ===
- Bane Pokhari
- Baraha Pokhari
- Chhitta Pokhari
- Homma Pokhari
- Indreni Pokhari
- Kaali Pokhari
- Laamche Pokhari

=== Morang district ===
- Imja
- Rani Pokhari Katahari
- Raja Rani Pokhari
- Sunbarsi Pokhari

=== Panchthar district ===
- Dabala Pokhari
- Gunte Pokhari
- Harkote Pokhari
- Hile Pokhari
- Jor Pokhari A
- Jor Pokhari B
- Lam Pokhari
- Suke Pokhari
- Suke Pokhari B

=== Sankhuwasabha district ===
- Akle Pokhari
- Banduke Pokhari
- Baulaha Pokhari
- Bhute Pokhari
- Dudhpokhari
- Ghante Pokhari
- Gupha Pokhari
- Jaljala Pokhari
- Khopi Pokhari
- Khuisi Pokhari
- Lam Pokhari
- Lampokhari
- Metalung Pokhari
- Nunriri Pokhari
- PachPokhari
- Panch Pokhari
- Ratto Pokhari
- Sadhu Pokhari
- Sano Pokhari
- Savapokhari
- Siddhapokhari
- Tato Chhanju Pokhri
- Thulo Pokhari
- Thampokhari
- Thulo Tatopni Spring (Nundhaki)
- Tinpokhari

=== Solukhumbu district ===
- Gokyo Lake Series
- Phurke Pokhari
- Suke Pokhari

=== Sunsari district ===
- Barju Taal
- Daita Pokhari
- Magar Daha
- Ra-Sa Taal
- Ramdhuni
- Taal Talaiya, Itahari

=== Taplejung district ===
- Kali Pokhari `A`
- Kali Pokhari `B`
- Suke Pokhari
- Tin pokhari
- lam pokhari
- jaljala pokhari
- shiva pokhari
- Timbung Pokhari

=== Tehrathum district ===
- Chichiling Pokhari
- Marga Pokhari
- Mudke Aahal
- Panchakanya Chhather Pokhari

=== Udayapur district ===
- Belha Gavi
- Dhar Pokhari
- Rautamai Pokhari
- Taple Pokhari

== Lumbini province ==
This province has 97 lakes, located in the Terai (92%); Hill (6%), and Mountain regions (2%). Districts with the most lakes in decreasing order are Rupandehi (28), Kapilvastu (24), Parasi (21), Dang (8), Banke (4), Bardiya (3), Arghakhanchi (2), Palpa (2), Pyuthan (2), Rukum (2) and Rolpa (2). Lumbini Sanskritik Municipality of Rupandehi district has the biggest number of lakes (7) compared to other Palikas.

=== Arghakhanchi district ===
- Rata Pokhari
- Sanglen Daha
- Thada Daha

=== Banke district ===
- Bageshwari Talau
- Rani Talau
- Waterpark

=== Bardiya district ===
- Badhaiya Taal
- Satkhaluwa Taal

=== Dang district ===
- Barhakune Daha
- Bhote Daha
- Charinge Daha
- Gaurigaun Taal
- Jakhera Picnic Spot
- Jakhera Tal
- Jyamire Taal
- Kichkanni Taal
- Purandhara Taal

=== Gulmi district ===
- Dibrung daha
- Timure Tal

=== Palpa district ===
- Kamal Pokhari
- Satyawati Tal
- Taalpokhara

=== Pyuthan district ===
- Shiva-Jamuna Pokhari

=== Rupandehi district ===
- Badki Gaddha Pokhari
- Bangai Pokhari
- Bhanaiya
- Bhelai Pokhari
- Dube Pokhari
- Gaidahawa Tal
- Gajedi Taal
- Ganwariya Tal
- Gidhiya Pokhari
- Jagdishpur Tal (Kapilvastu)
- Jamuhani Pokhari
- Jamuhani Pokhari
- Karauta Pokhari
- Kurmindihawa
- Kuttwa Pokhari
- Majhagawa Pokhari
- Mohamadnagar Pokhari
- Nala Pokhari
- Nanda Vauju Tal
- Paschim Pokhari
- Pipari Pokhari
- Purba Pokhari
- Rayapur Tal
- Rohinihawa Tal
- Sagrahawa Tal
- Shankarpur Pokhari
- Sisausemara Tal
- Tareni Pokhari
- Tiger Top Tal
- Tiwari Kataiya Pokhari
- Thulo Pokhara
- Yekladih Pokhari

=== Rukum East district ===
- Kamal Daha
- Chhipre Daha
- Syarpu Taal

== Madhesh province ==
=== Bara district ===
- Gadiganga Taal
- Halkhoria Lake
- Ishara Pokhari
- Jharkhuria Lake
- Kamini Daha
- Ramjanaki Pokhari
- Sohiri Lake

=== Dhanusha district ===
- Aagni Kund
- Angraj Sar
- Beeshahara Sagar
- Bihar Kunda
- Bindhichowk Pokhari
- Biral Sagar
- Chapkai Pokhari
- Devpura Lake
- Dhanu Sagar
- Ganga Sagar
- Gautam Sarobar
- Ithi Pokhari
- Kapalmochani Sagar
- Kuti Pokhari
- Laski Pokhari
- Maharaj Sagar
- Manipal Taal
- Murali Sagar
- Parseni Sagar
- Rukmini Sagar
- Singrahi Lake
- Subbaji Pokhari
- Tarahi Pokhari

=== Mahottari district ===
- Bramhasthan Pokhari
- Dami Madai Pokhari
- Gotman Sagar
- Mahadev Pokhari
- Naini Pokhari
- Purni Pokhari
- Rani Pokhari
- Satuniya Pokhari
- Sukhdev Pokhari
- Telia Pokhari
- Thari Pokhari
- Tharuhai Pokhari
- Sanshar Pokhari

=== Parsa district ===
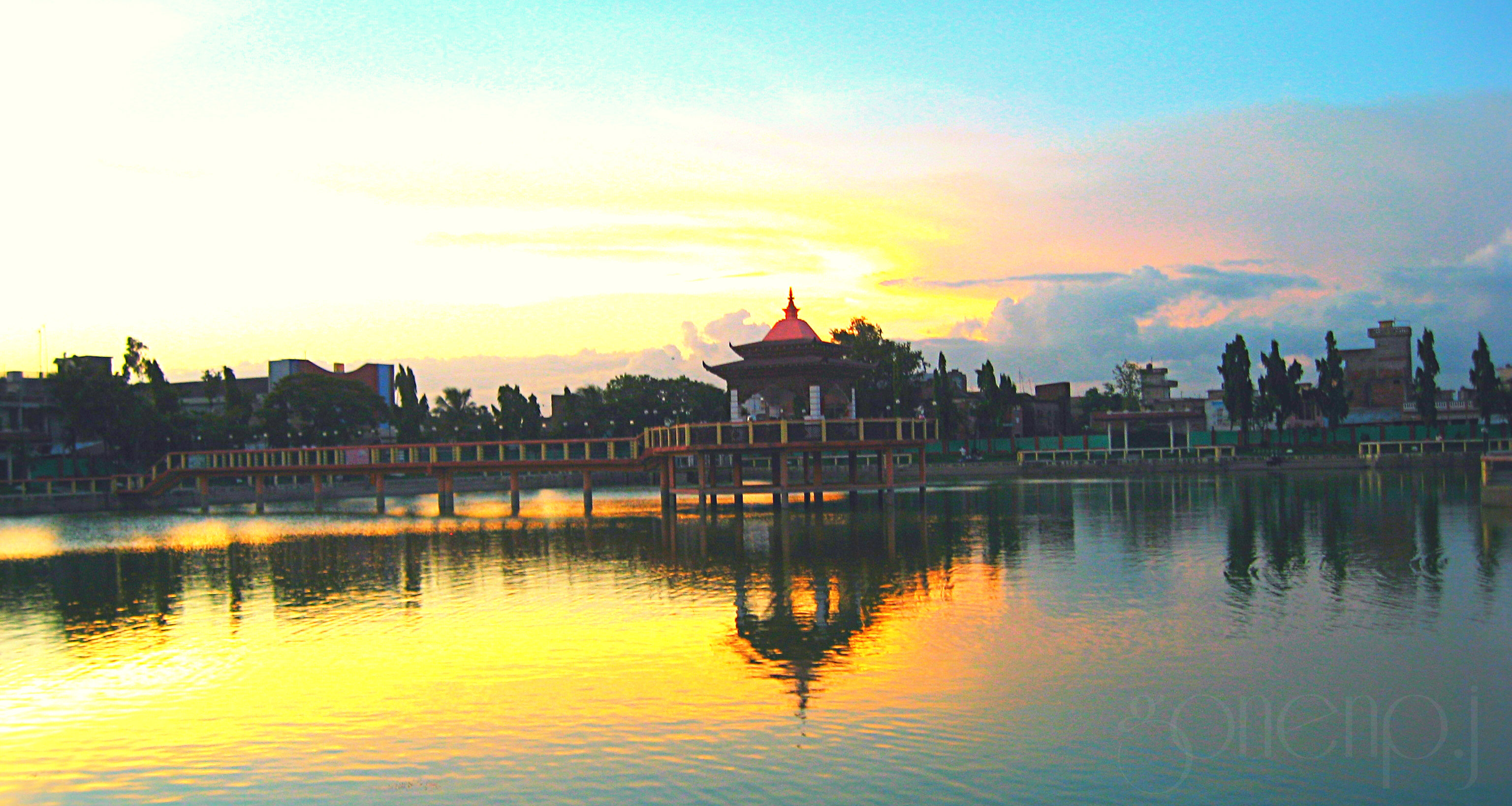
Ghadiarwa Pokhari, Birgunj

- Banjari Pokhari
- Chhapkaiya pokhari
- Gamharia Pokhari
- Ghadiarwa Pokhari
- Kamini Daha
- Maidiya Pokhari
- Nagawa Pokhari
- Nawagachhi Dam
- Rabidash Pokhari

=== Rautahat district ===
- Ayub Amba Pokhari
- Bauddhi Pokhari
- Chandi Pokhari
- Dhamaura Pokhari
- Digha Kifayat Pokhari
- Fatuwa Bhutahi Pokhari
- Gaur Pokhari
- Ghordaur Pokhari
- Mahadev Pokhari
- Mahakar Pokhari
- Mardhar Pokhari
- Nagarpalika Pokhari
- Nunthar Pokhari
- Siwalye Pokhari

=== Saptari district ===
- Bagmohi Nadi
- Balan Nadi
- Ghordha Nadi
- Jhola Daha
- Kamal Daha
- Khadak Nadi
- Khado Nadi
- Lohajara Thakur Daha
- Mutni Nadi
- Purni Pokhari
- Sakuwayi Pokhari
- Singaya Dhar
- Singrahi Pokhari
- Thani Pokhari

=== Sarlahi district ===
- Betini Daha
- Bharat Tal
- Chandragunj Pokhari
- Hatmare Pokhari
- Kerwa Pokhari
- Laxmipur Pokhari
- Lekhandehi Taal
- Math Pokhari
- Nadhi Taal
- Nadiman Lake
- Nagarpalika Pokhari
- Nassi Pokhari
- Panpiya Taal
- Purano Pokhari

=== Siraha district ===
- Aada Pokhari
- Baban Tol Pokhari
- Beli Pokhari
- Bhabari baisakha dah
- Bishnupur Pokhari
- Dewal Pokhari
- Kamal Daha
- Mahadev Pokhari
- Manik Daha
- Narahiya Pokhari
- Naya Bandh
- Patari Pokhari
- Purni Pokhari
- Rajdevi Pokhari

== Sudurpashchim province ==
=== Achham district ===
- Barha Banda Aathara Khanada
- Batulee
- Kalidaha
- Khaptad Lake
- Ramaroshan

=== Bajhang district ===
- Bhumi Saovar
- Surma Sarovar
- Tima Daha

=== Bajura district ===
- Budhinanda
- Chhede Daha
- Kailash Tal
- Rakshyas

=== Dadeldhura district ===
- Ali Taal (Lake)
- Bodapathi Tal (Lake)
- Nayal Tal (Lake)

=== Darchula district ===
- Brahama Daha
- Kalidhunga Taal
- Bayali Taal
- Khatti Tal
- Ringdepani Taal
- Pasa Daha

=== Doti district ===
- Ali Taal
- Chatiwan Lake
- Khaptad Lake
- Sun Daha

=== Kailali district ===
- Ghodaghodi Tal
- Jakhaur/Jokhar Tal (Dhangadhi)
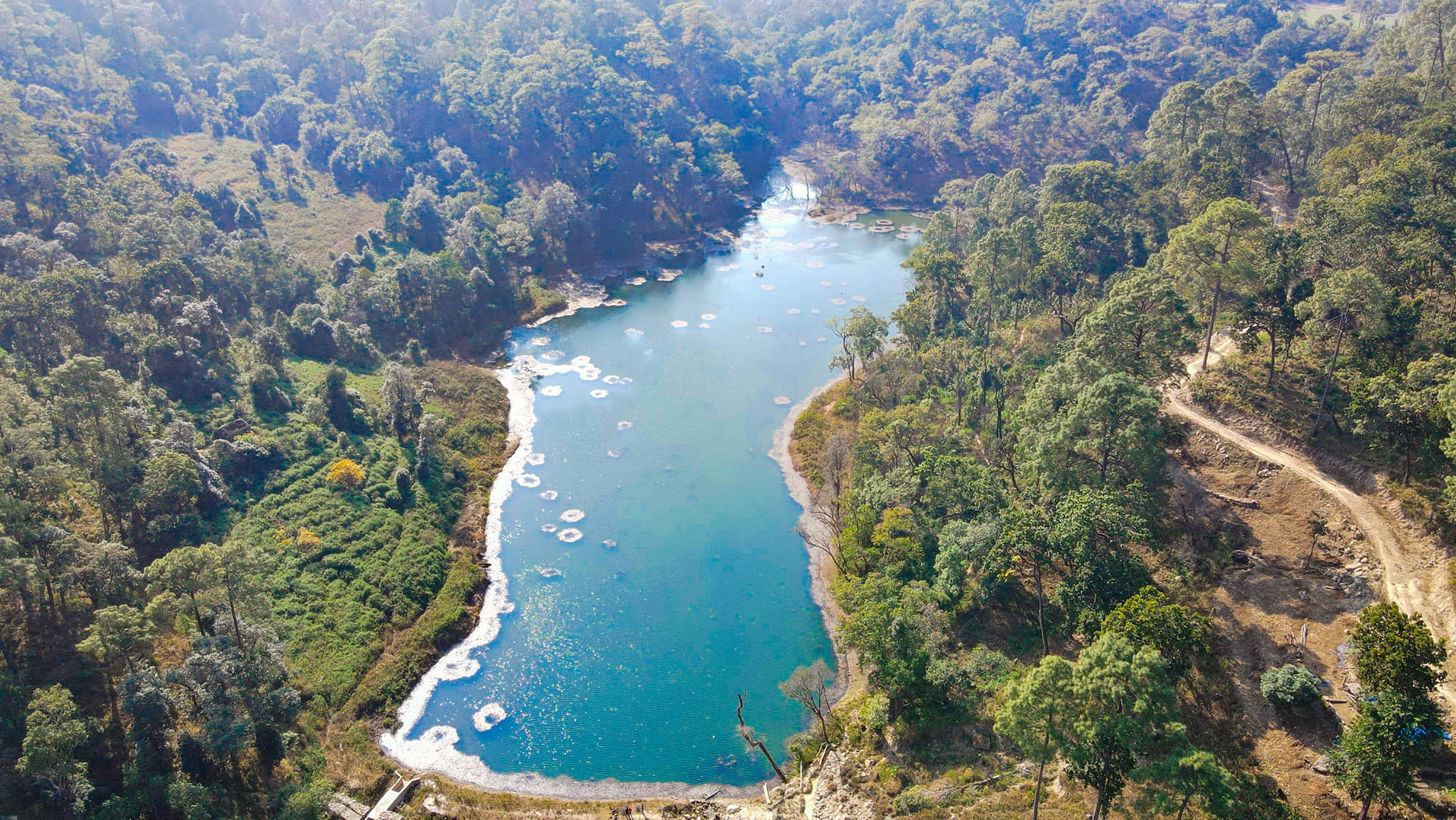
- Nayal Tal (Godawari)
- Lami Tal (Godawari)

=== Kanchanpur district ===
- Bedkot Tal
- Jhilmila Tal
- Kamal Pokhari – Daijee
- Mudka Tal
- Rani Tal
- Sundeu Tal

== See also ==
- List of rivers of Nepal
- History of limnology in Nepal
