= Ramaroson =

Ramaroson is a surname. Notable people with the name include:

- Arlette Ramaroson (born 1944), Malagasy judge
- Benjamin Marc Ramaroson (born 1955), Archbishop of the Roman Catholic Archdiocese of Antsiranana in Madagascar
- Hyppolite Ramaroson (born 1951), Malagasy vice admiral and politician
- Nadine Ramaroson (1958–2011), French-born politician in Madagascar

== See also ==
- Ramarosan
