= History of limnology in Nepal =

The history of limnology in Nepal focuses on the study of limnology in Nepal, which has been done by many foreign and Nepali researchers and students of Tribhuvan University.

== Parameters ==
The research was done mainly on the following parameters:

- pH
- aquatic plants and their types
- composition of fresh water
- water and land relationship
- seasonal changes in the lakes

== Studies ==
- In 1970 The first study was done by a German limnologist L.Loffler in Khumbu area.
- In 1980 there were 20 studies.
- Until 1990 the number of studies were 20.
- From 2001–2009 76 studies were done in lakes and ponds like Tilicho Lake, Rara Lake. The first study on Tilicho was in 1959.

== Field laboratory ==
- "In April 1977 work was started on a laboratory office building. This was ready for use in September 1977. The building offers sufficient space, a good laboratory bench with power outlets, etc. A library room is also provided. However, the building might prove unsatisfactory for continuing activities if leakage problems are not attended to."
- Upon establishment of the laboratory some of the equipment and tools included were a stereo microscope, microscope, top pan balance, "a Hachkit for simple chemical analysis and a refrigerator".
- Later other equipment was procured including a hydrographic winch, rubber dinghy, portable echosounder, laboratory glassware, and specimen jars.

== See also ==
- List of rivers of Nepal
- List of lakes of Nepal
