= Kajin Sara Lake =

Kajin Sara
- Location within Gandaki Province Location within Nepal
- Interactive map of Kajin Sara
- Location: Manang district, Nepal
- Coordinates: 28°29′48.7″N 84°15′22.2″E
- Type: lake

Kajin Sara is a lake in the Manang district of Nepal.

== History ==
A group of mountaineers discovered the Kajin Sara lake in early 2019. The lake is situated in Chame rural municipality of Manang district, Nepal. The lake is 1,500 meters long and 600 meters wide in its dimensions. The lake is one of the highest altitude lakes in the world, 5,020 m above sea level. It is considered sacred by Buddhists, Sikhs and Hindus. It will be highest altitude lake replacing Tilicho Lake, which is now the highest lake in the world.

== Trekking route ==
The visitors can reach Chame of Manang District via jeep from Besisahar, Lamjung. The trekking starts from Chame, Nepal situated at 2650 m altitude.

The First-day trek is about a 5-6 hour walk uphill up to 3760 m to stay at Lamjung Himal Base Camp. The trail starts with motor roads and follows along the forest filled with pine trees. The path dips up and down until you reach Lamjung Himal Base Camp. There are some Sheds and a new shelter for accommodation, where trekkers can spend overnight free of cost, however, you have to carry your food and sleeping equipment.

The next day's trek is of 6–10 hours to high camp at 4750m depending upon weather condition. There is a place to stay at high camp. Low camp is still under construction at 4200m, which upon completion will make this trekking route much easier for the tourists.

Day 3 is a 2 hours walk uphill from high camp to Kajin Sara at 5020 m and return to High camp (2hours) or Lamjung base camp(6–8 hours).

Day 4 from Lamjung Base camp to Chame rural municipality.
