= Timbung Pokhari =

Natural lake at 4480m elevation in Nepal

- तिमबुन्ग पोखरी (Nepali)
- Location of Timbung Pokhari in Nepal
- Interactive map of Timbung Pokhari
- Location: Taplejung District, Nepal
- Coordinates: 27°26′15″N 88°03′30″E
- Type: Natural freshwater lake
- Max. length: 466 metres (1,529 ft)
- Max. width: 154 metres (505 ft)

Timbung Pokhari (Nepali: तिमबुन्ग पोखरी) is a natural fresh water lake located at an elevation of 4335 m in Sidingwa Rural Municipality in the Taplejung district of Nepal. The name was given to the pond because it often makes a gunfire sound. The lake is about 466 m long and 154 m wide.

The lake is visited by anybody who believes in miracle known as bhakal. Locals believe that wishes of pilgrims come true by visiting the lake.

The lake can be reached by about two days on foot from Chyangthapu.

The perfect time to visit the Timbung Pokhari is between March – October and in Mid-July – August. In this period of time, sight seekers get a chance to explore the natural biodiversity, scenic view of Mt. Kanchenjunga and Pokhari itself in a more close-up look.

== See also ==
- List of lakes of Nepal
