= Taalpokhara =

Natural lake in Nepal

Taalpokhara Lake
- Location within Nepal
- Location: Palpa District, Nepal
- Coordinates: 27.8765°N 83.8795°E
- Type: Fresh water lake
- Basin countries: Nepal

Taalpokhara (Nepali: तालपोखरा) is a natural freshwater lake located in Rampur, Palpa district in Nepal.

== See also ==
- List of lakes of Nepal
