= Khaptad Baba =

Hindu saint

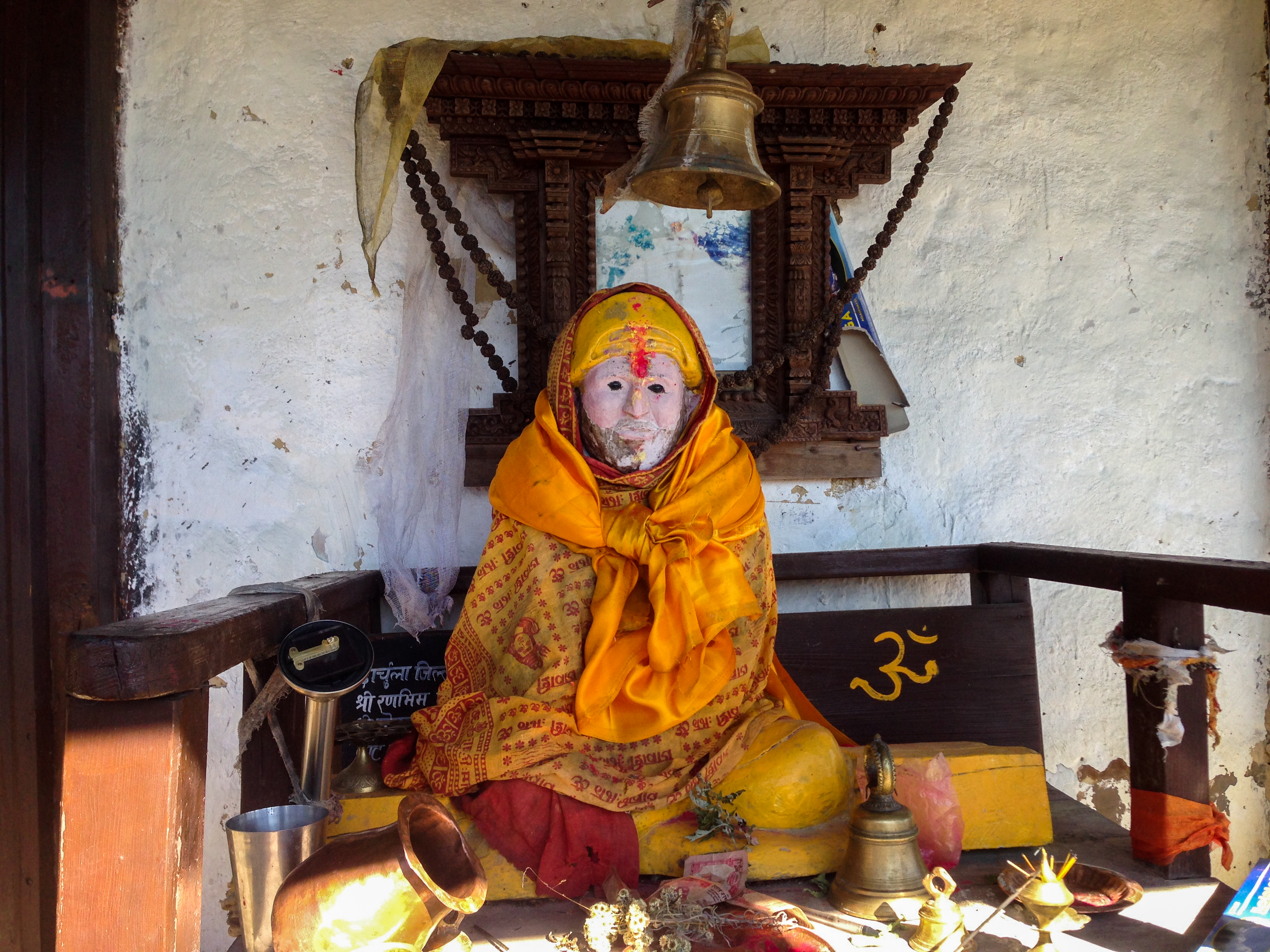
- An effigy of Khaptad Baba at his ashram
- Born: Kashmir
- Died: May 9, 1996; Pokhara, Nepal
- Other names: Sri 1008 Brahmavit Paramahansa Yogi Schitananda Saraswati, Khaptad Swami
- Known for: Contribution in disseminating Vedic knowledge regarding medicinal herbs, yoga, meditation and science of thought.
- Notable work: The Science of Thought, Dharma-Vigyan
- Website: khaptadswami.com.np

Khaptad Baba, also known as Swami Sachchidananda, was a spiritual saint who traveled along the high mountainous regions of Nepal and settled temporarily in Ilam, Kalinchowk, Swargadwari, Mushikot, Chandannath and ultimately in the Khaptad Valley in the 1940s to meditate and worship. He lived for more than fifty years in the valley, and overlooked the establishment of Khaptad National Park in 1984. He is revered as a Hindu saint. Within the national park, a hermitage, temples, and stone statues remain.

== Early life ==
Born as Shivanath Dogra in 1880 into the Dogra family living in Kashmir. Before taking renouncement(sannyas), he was a talented allopathic doctor. He studied M. B. B. S. from the Tropical Medical College in Calcutta and surgery in the UK. Later he quit medical practice then took sannyas. After studying and teaching Eastern philosophy at the Dakshinamurti Math in Kashi, he chose Khaptad National Park in Nepal for intensive meditation and stayed there till the end.
