= Barhakune Daha =

Lake in Nepal

- Nepali: ब्रहाकुने दह
- Location within Nepal
- Location: Dang District, Lumbini Province
- Coordinates: 28°04′24″N 82°29′8″E
- Basin countries: Nepal

Barhakune Daha (Nepali: ब्रहाकुने दह ) is a lake that lies in the Dang District, Nepal. This is situated in Ghorahi sub-metropolitan city- 07. Baraha Kshetra is three kilometres (1.9 mi) away from the market. This lies in north-west Mahabharat hilly regions’ arms. On the first of Magh (Nepali calendar), there helds the big fare.

People gather ashore the Barhakune Daha on the occasion of Maghe Sankranti

- Barhakune Daha and Baraha Temple: It lies in the 7th ward of the municipality. There is a pond that has twelve corners (angles); hence its name barha kune daha. The Temple of God Bishnu, barah is also an important place for pilgrims in that area, and several temples of Ganesh and Shiva are there. A special fair is organised here during Maghe Sankranti. It is also a tourist spot.

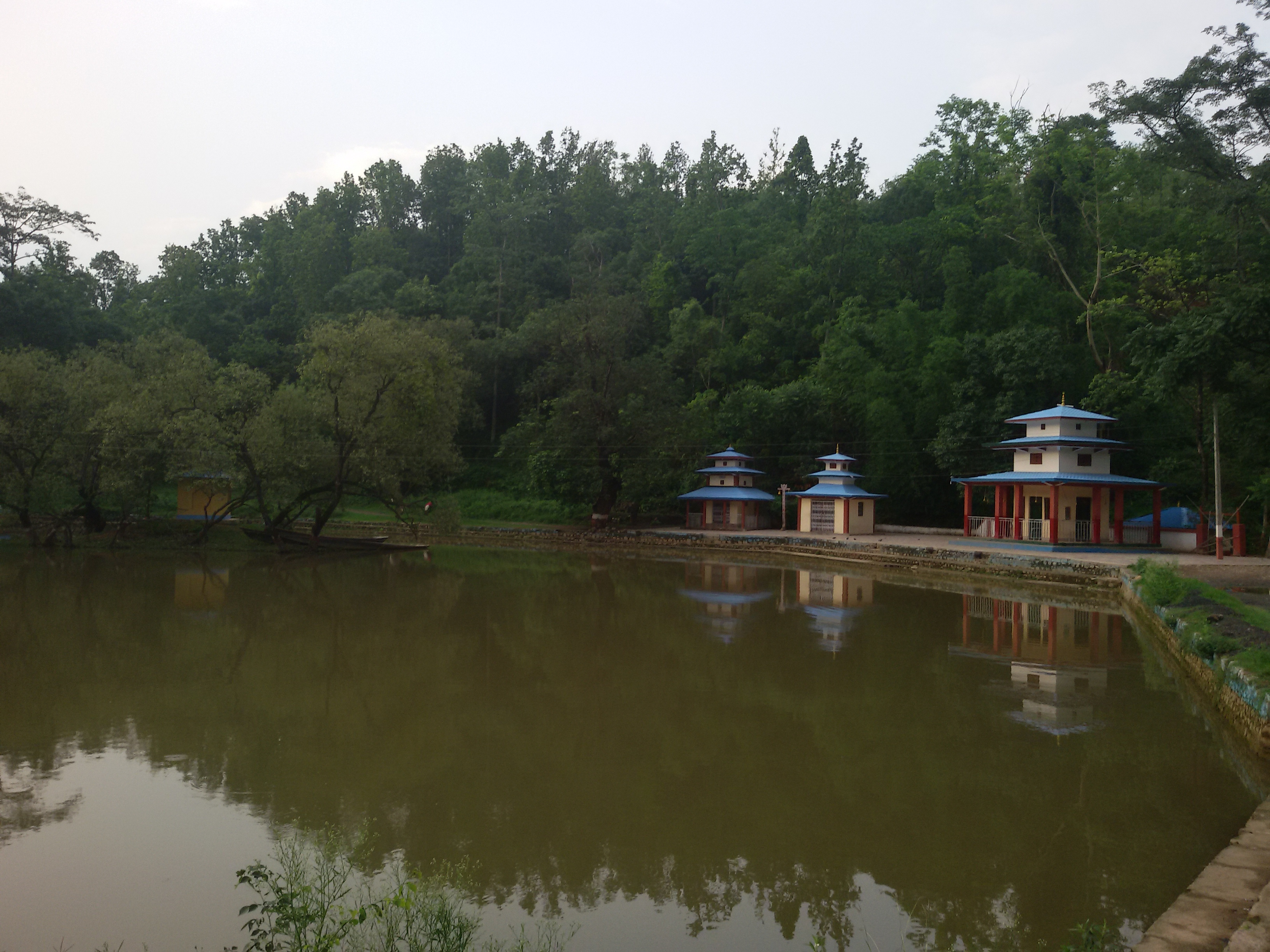
Barhakune Daha & Baraha Temple Area in Dang

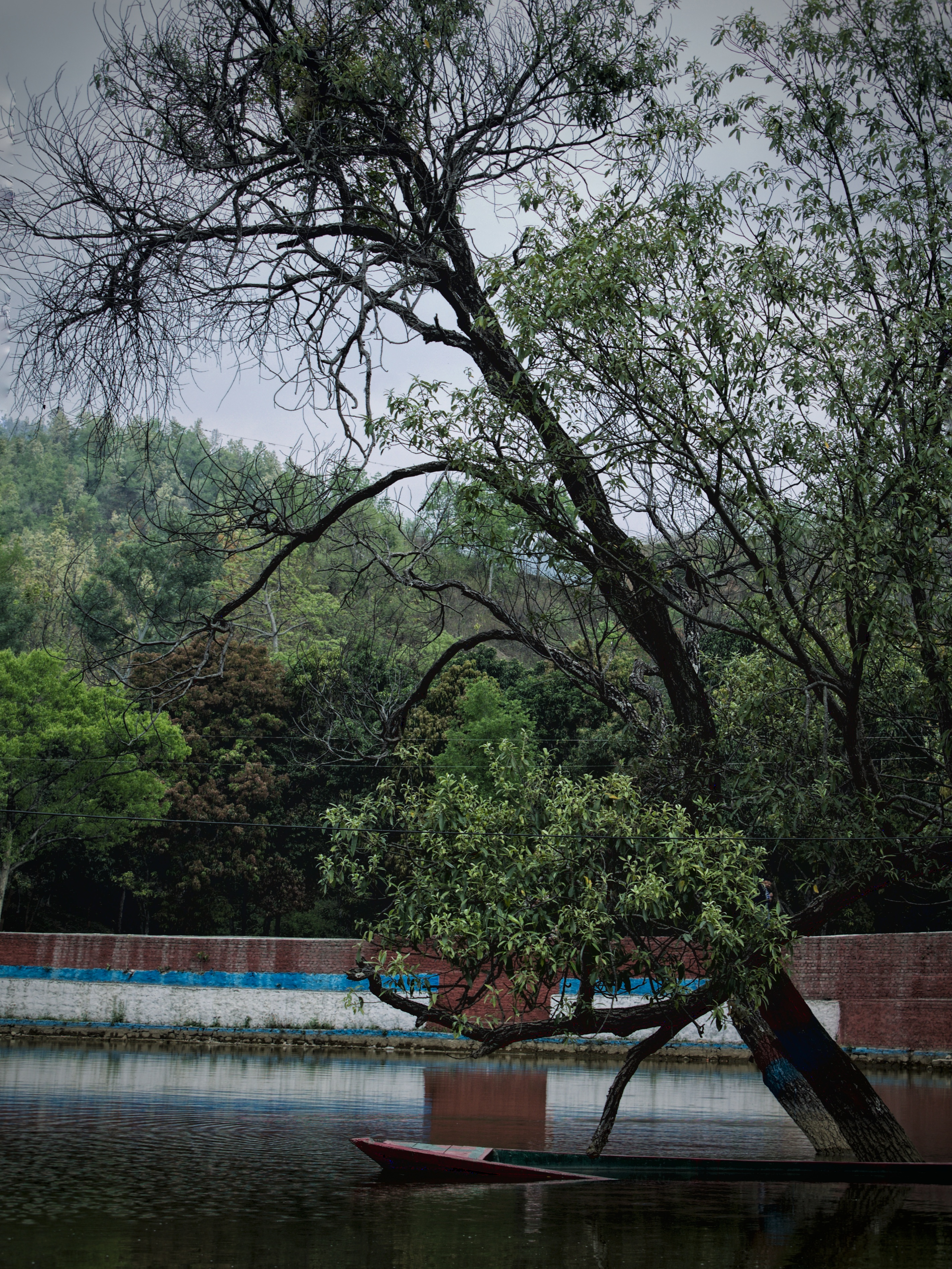
Barakune Daha

== See also ==
- List of lakes of Nepal
