= Khaptad Lake =

Lake in Nepal

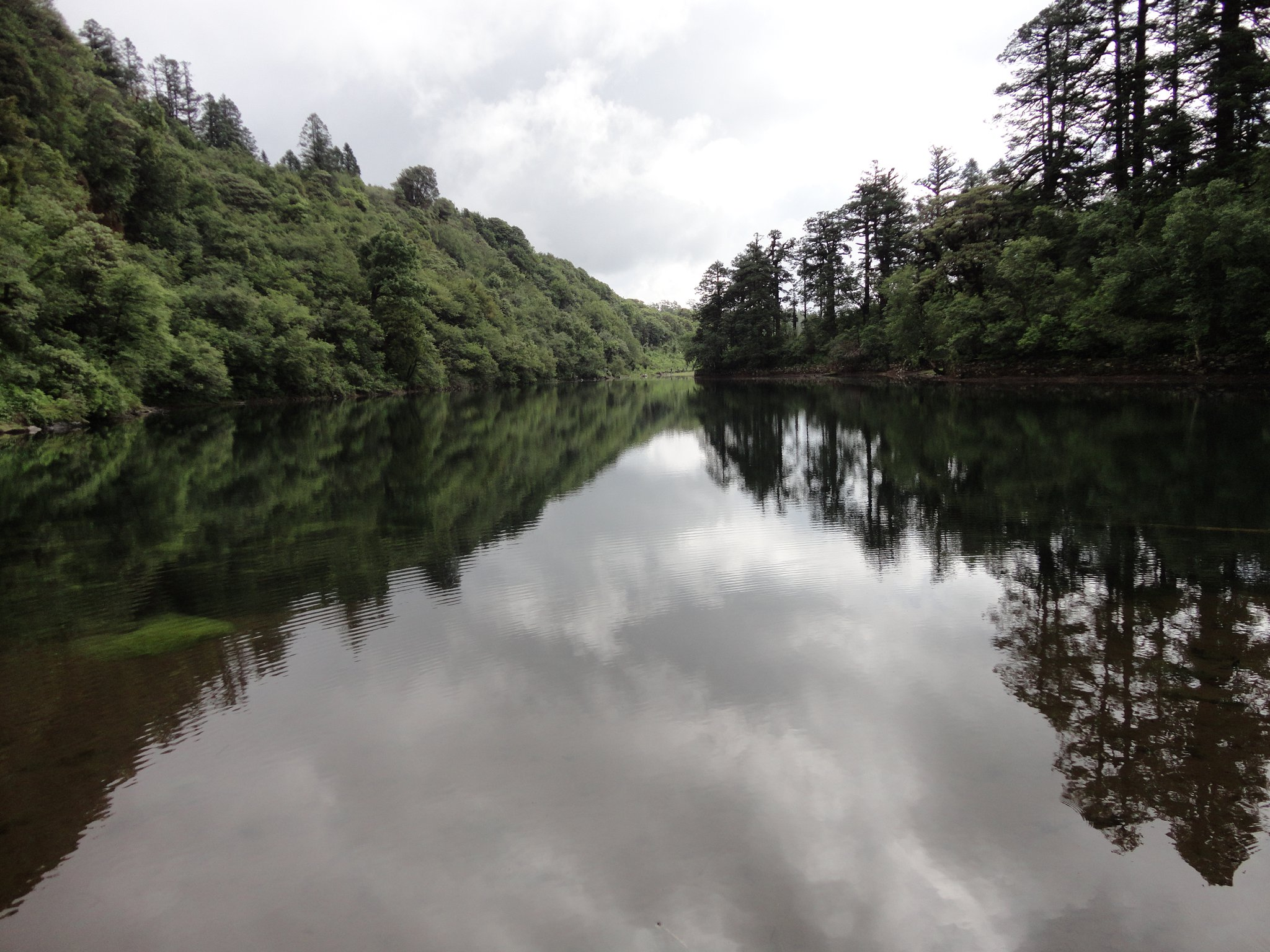

- Location within Nepal
- Location: Doti, Nepal
- Coordinates: 29°23′12″N 80°10′06″E
- Lake type: fresh water lake
- Basin countries: Nepal
- Surface elevation: 3,050 m (10,010 ft)

Khaptad Lake (Nepali: खप्तड ताल) is a lake in Doti district of western Nepal. The lake is situated at north-eastern part of Khaptad National Park and an altitude of 3,050 m (10,010 ft).

== See also ==
- Khaptad National Park
