= Jakhera Tal =

Lake in Nepal

- Nepali: जखेरा ताल
- Location within Nepal
- Location: Dang District, Lumbini Province
- Coordinates: 27°52′31″N 82°34′24″E
- Basin countries: Nepal

Jakhera Tal (Nepali: जखेरा ताल ) is a lake situated in Lamahi Municipality Dang District, Nepal. The lake stretches over 5.5 bighas of land is surrounded by forest and is six-feet deep. There is a temple of Lord Ganesh to its north and Siddeshwar Mahadev Temple to its east.

== See also ==
- List of lakes of Nepal
