= Ramarosan =

Ramarosan रामारोशन
- Village development committee
- Location in Nepal
- Coordinates: 29.23°N 81.46°E
- Country: Nepal
- Zone: Seti Zone
- District: Achham District

Population (2001)
  - Total: 4,399
  - Religions: Hindu
- Time zone: UTC+5:45 (Nepal Time)

Ramarosan is a village in Achham District in the Seti Zone of western Nepal. At the time of the 2001 Nepal census, the population was 4399, of which 28% was literate. Beautiful Ramaroshan Area is also located in this VDC.
