= Kamal Lake =

Natural lake in Nepal

Kamal lake (Lotus Lake)
- Rukmini Lake
- कमल ताल (Nepali)
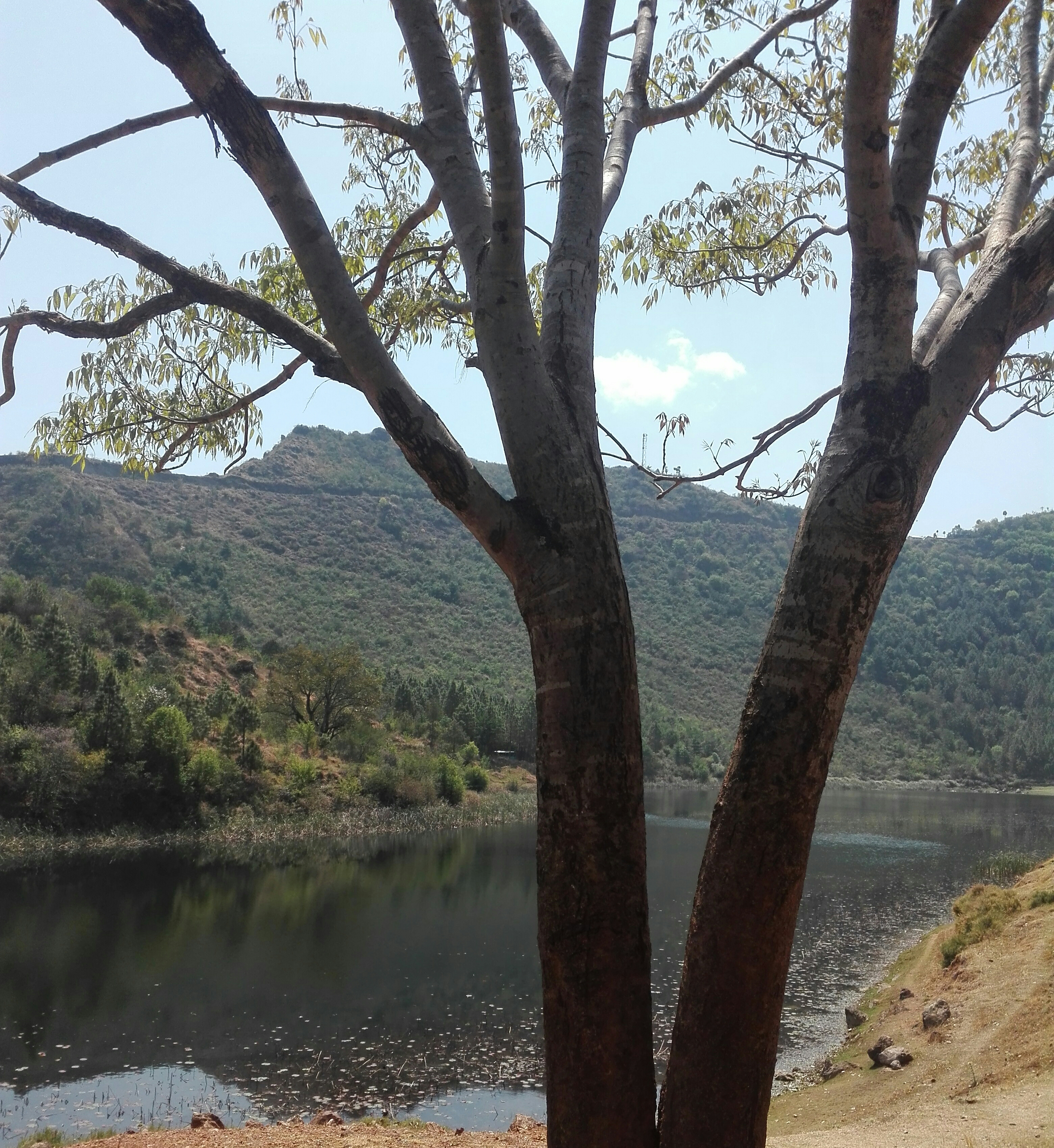
- View of Kamal lake
- Location: Rukumkot, Rukum, Nepal
- Coordinates
- Basin countries: Nepal
- Designation: Lake
- Surface area: 2 km^{2} (0.77 sq mi)
- Surface elevation: 1,372 metres (4,501 ft)
- Settlements: Rukumkot

Kamal lake (Nepali: कमल ताल), also called Rukmani lake (Nepali: रुक्मिणी ताल), is located in Rukum district of western Nepal. The lake is popular for lotus flower. The surface area of the lake is about 2 km^{2}.

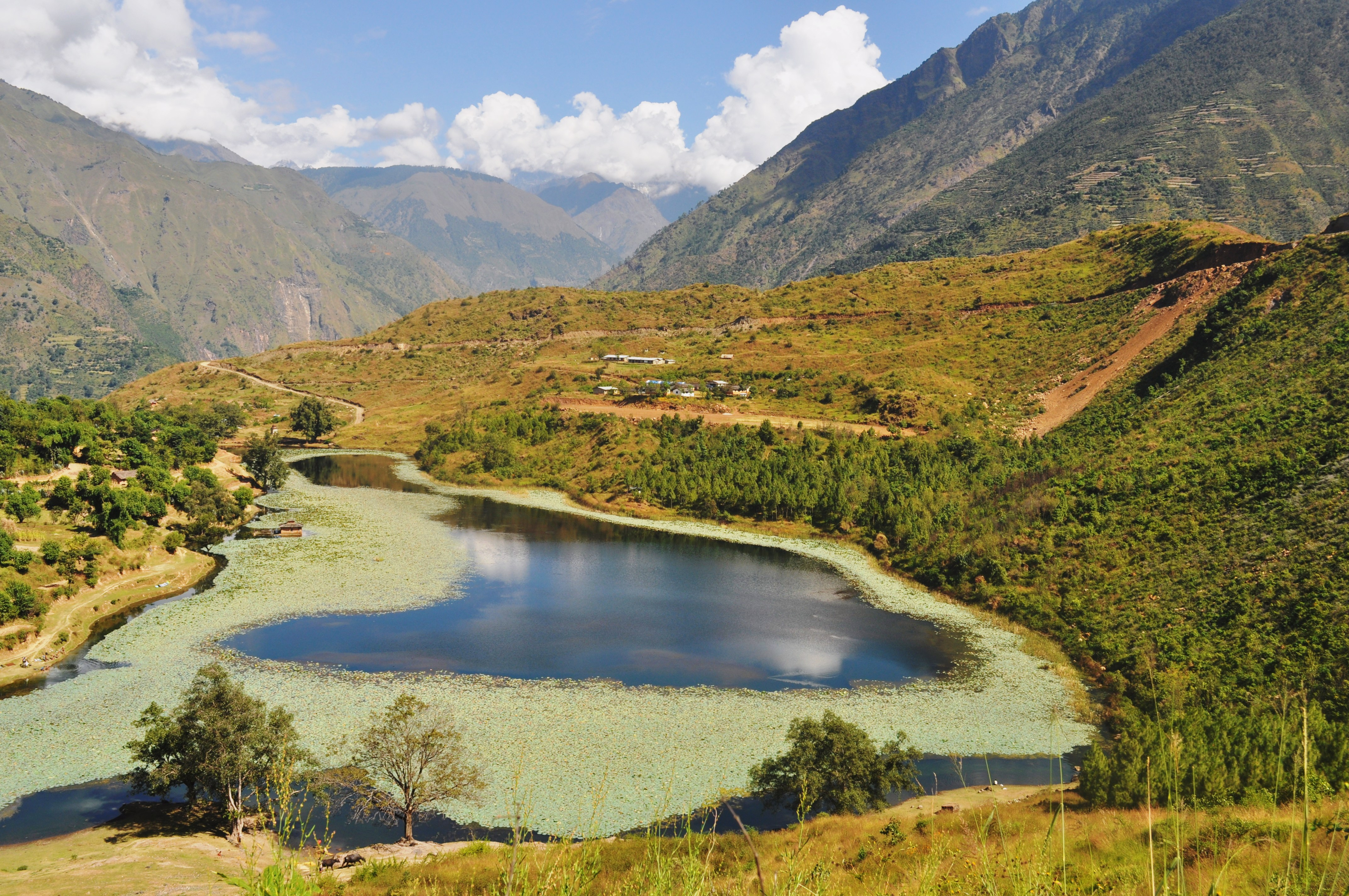
Rukmini Lake, named after Krishna's consort in the Mahābhārata

== See also ==
- List of lakes of Nepal
