= Dhumba lake =

Fresh water lake in Mustang, Nepal

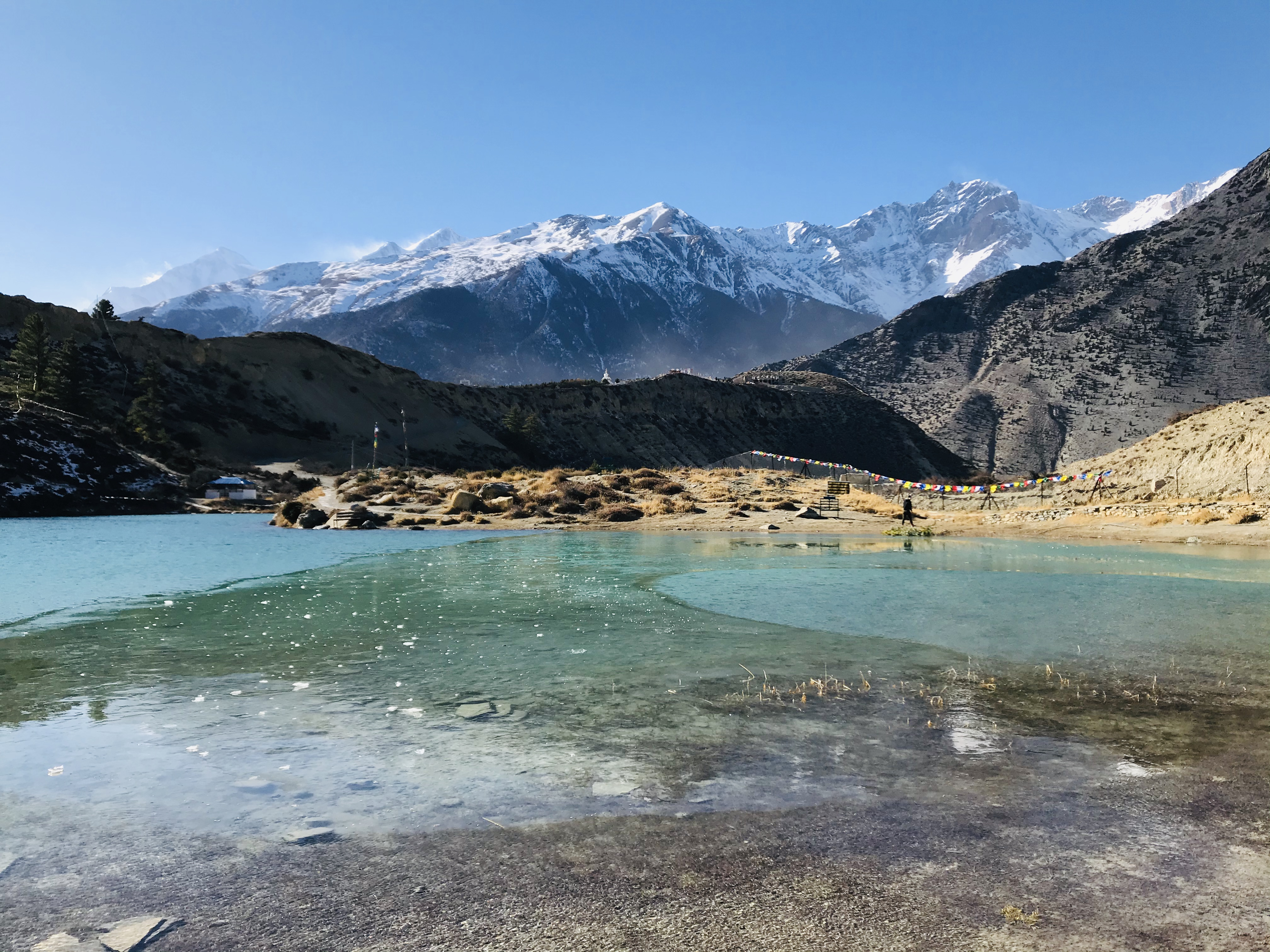

- Location within Nepal
- Interactive map of Dhumba lake
- Location: Mustang District, Nepal
- Coordinates: 28°45′48″N 83°42′59″E
- Designation: Lake
- Surface elevation: 2,830 metres (9,280 ft)

Dhumba lake is located in Mustang district of Nepal at an altitude of 2830 m. It is about 5.5 km west of Jomsom Thini village. The lake is about 150 meters long and 100 meters wide. The lake is fed by ice melt from Mount Nilgiri.

The lake is considered sacred by Buddhists and Hindu pilgrims. According to the legend, once the lake changed to red color. A Buddhist monk performed some rituals and turned it back to natural color. Due to the religious belief, the fishes of the lake is not consumed.

== Gallery ==
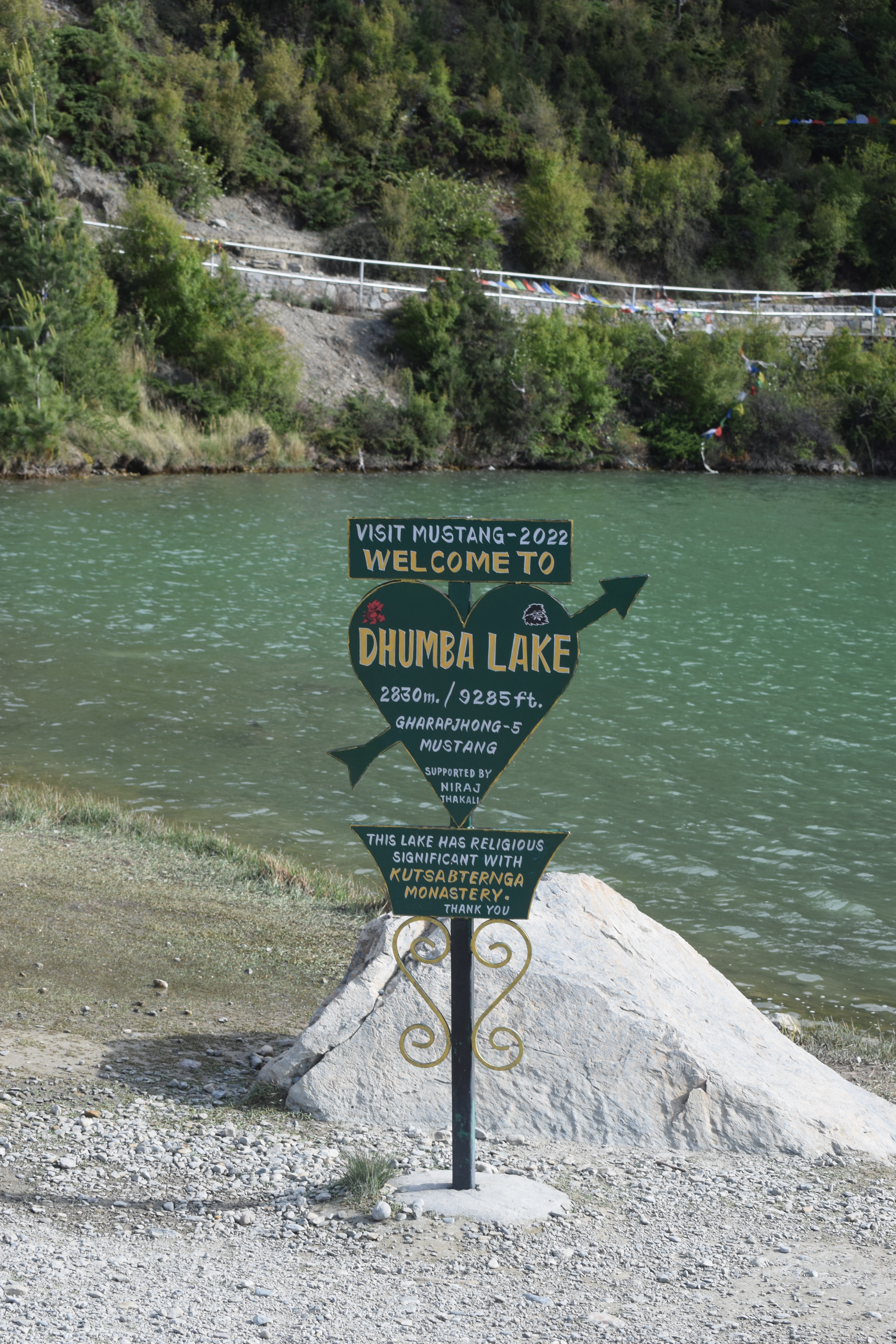
Dhumba Lake

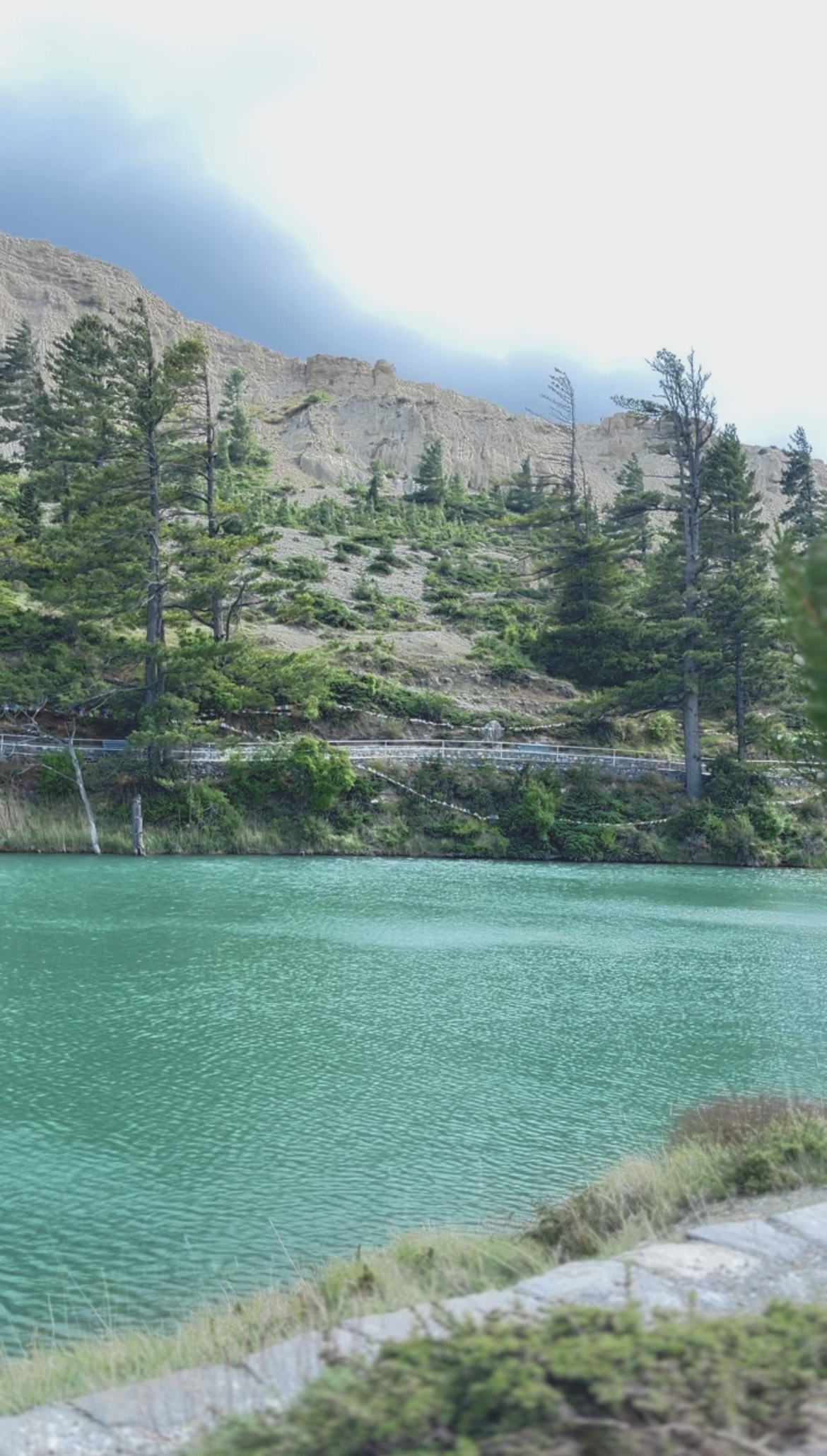
Dhumba Lake in 2024
