= Ikha Pokhari =

Historic pond in Kathmandu, Nepal

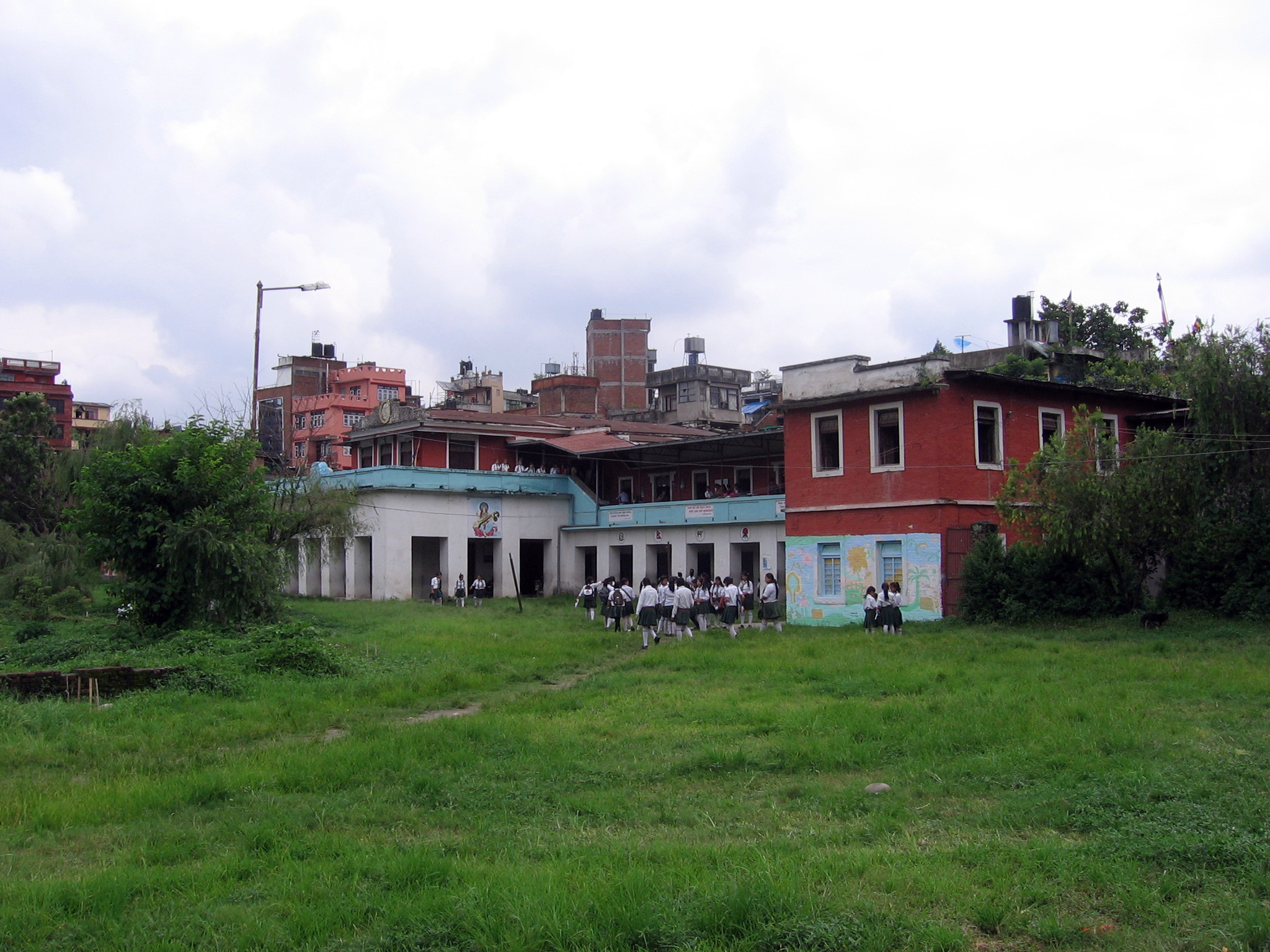
- Dried Ikha Pokhari and Kanya Mandir School in background

- Location within Nepal
- Location: Kathmandu, Nepal
- Coordinates: 27.710°N 85.307°E
- Type: Pond

Ikha Pokhari (Nepali:इखा पोखरी) or Ekha Pukhu is a historic pond in Chhetrapati, Kathmandu. The surface area of the pond is about seven ropanis. The pond has dried up due to siltation and over extraction of water. Land encroachment has been taking place around the pond. A public school, Kanya Mandir school lies just next to the pond. Legally, the pond is registered to the school.

Before it dried up, the pond was used for various rituals by locals, mainly Newar people. Locals are planning to revive the pond.

There were two additional ponds nearby Ikha pokhari, however due to land encroachment, these ponds have disappeared.
