= Ramaroshan Site =

Ramarosan Lake
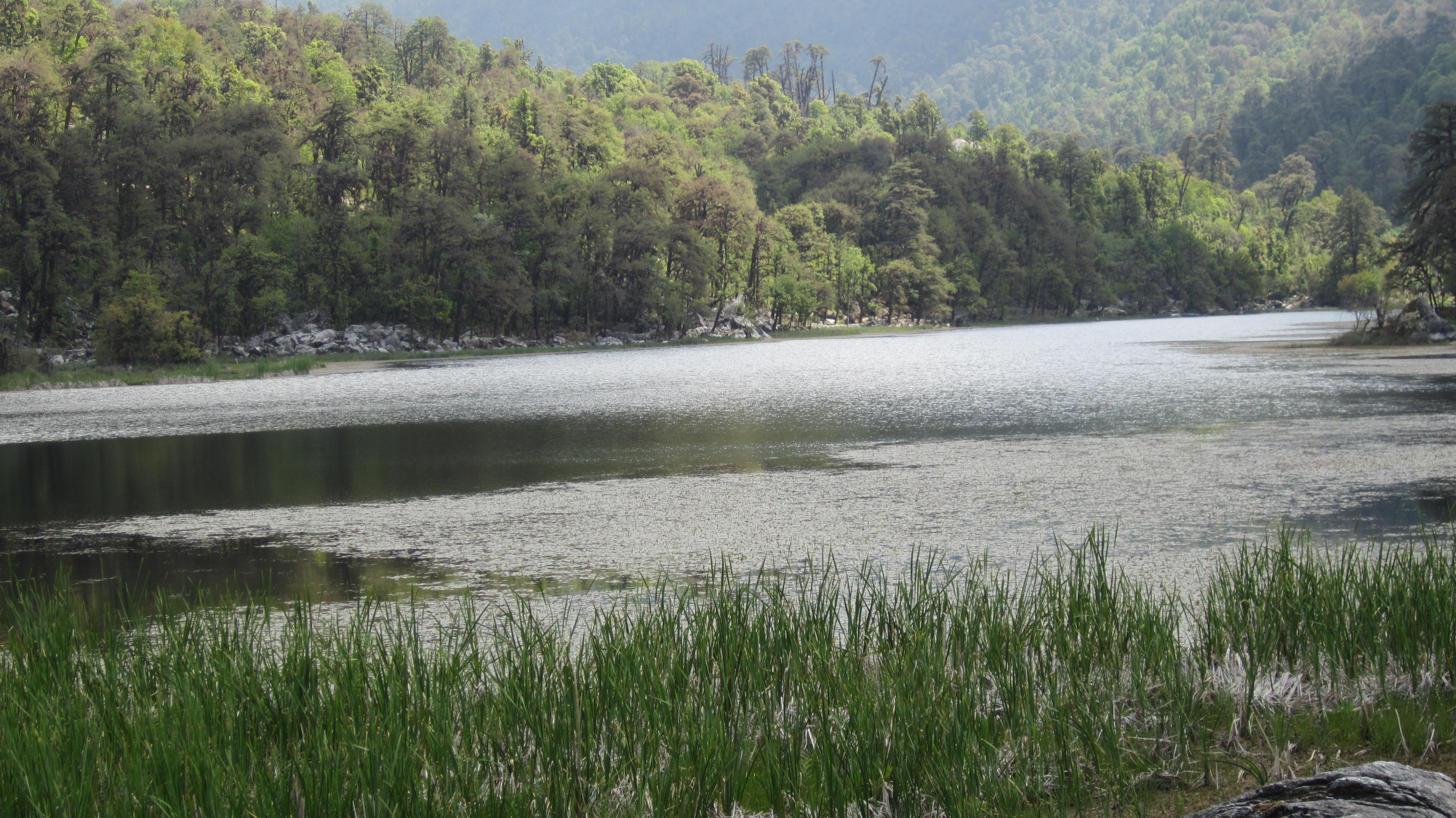
- Ramaroshan Lake

- Location within Nepal
- Location: Achham, Nepal
- Coordinates: 29°13′55.95″N 81°28′9.67″E
- Type: fresh water lake
- Basin countries: Nepal
- Surface area: 1,000 ha (2,500 acres)
Designations

Ramaroshan is located in Achham district of Nepal at an altitude of 2500m. A place having 18 patches of meadows (locally known as patans), it is a major tourism site of Achham district. This area is one of the habitats of the national bird of Nepal, Danfe (Lophophorus). A good view of Budhiganga basin, along with the peaks of Mount Api, and Mount Saipal can be seen from Ramaroshan area.

The Badimalika–Ramaroshan Forest Conservation Area is the newest addition to Nepal's network of protected zones, formally declared by the Sudurpaschim Province government on August 12, 2026. It bridges two ecologically and culturally significant regions in the Far-West region under a single conservation framework.

== Introduction ==
Ramaroshan is a main attraction of Achham District. It is known as land of 12 lakes and 18 patch of meadows (grassland) (Nepali: बाह्र बण्ड, अठार खण्ड) with stiff rocky cliffs. Jigale lake is the largest lake in this area which has the shape of English letter 'Y whereas Taule lake is the smallest one. Among the 18 patans, Kinimini patan is the largest patan, possibly the largest patan in the Achham District through which the Kailash river flows. This place is surrounded by a forest. Terraced hill slopes with lush green landscape surrounding the enchanting Ramaroshan Lake attracts everyone. On the route to this destination, travellers come across the forest of Rhododendron. Boating has been started since 2020 and people can encounter Himalayan Munal{National bird of Nepal}

== Flora ==
Many species of plants are found in Ramaroshan area. Mostly lakes have been covered by various types of flowers. Many wild animals graze in the grassland of Ramaroshan.

== Fauna ==
It is a habitat of various wild animal i.e. bear, wild cat, musk deer etc. Ramaroshan is also a habitat for various birds like lophophorous, pheasant, cuckoo etc.

== Gallery ==
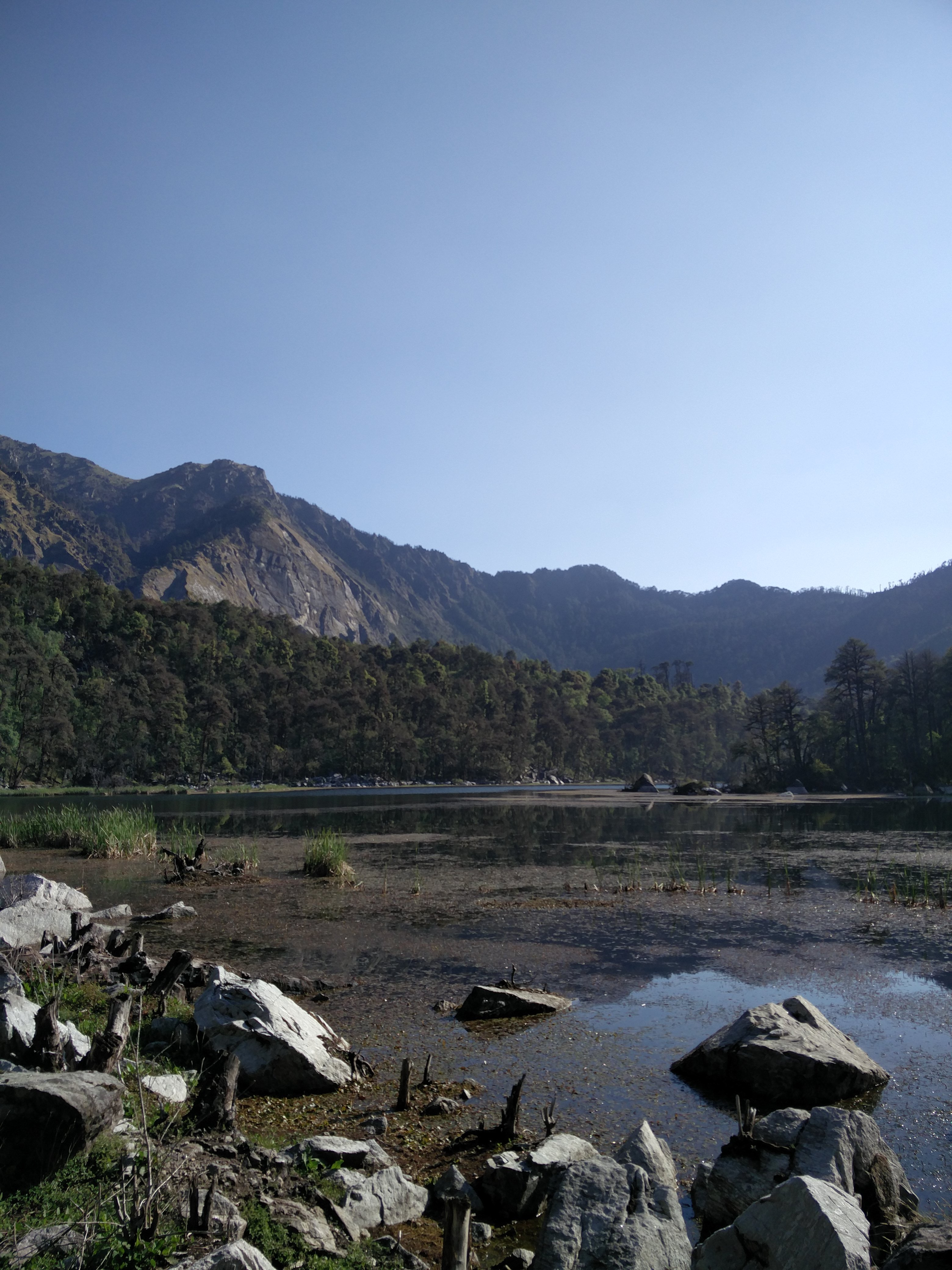

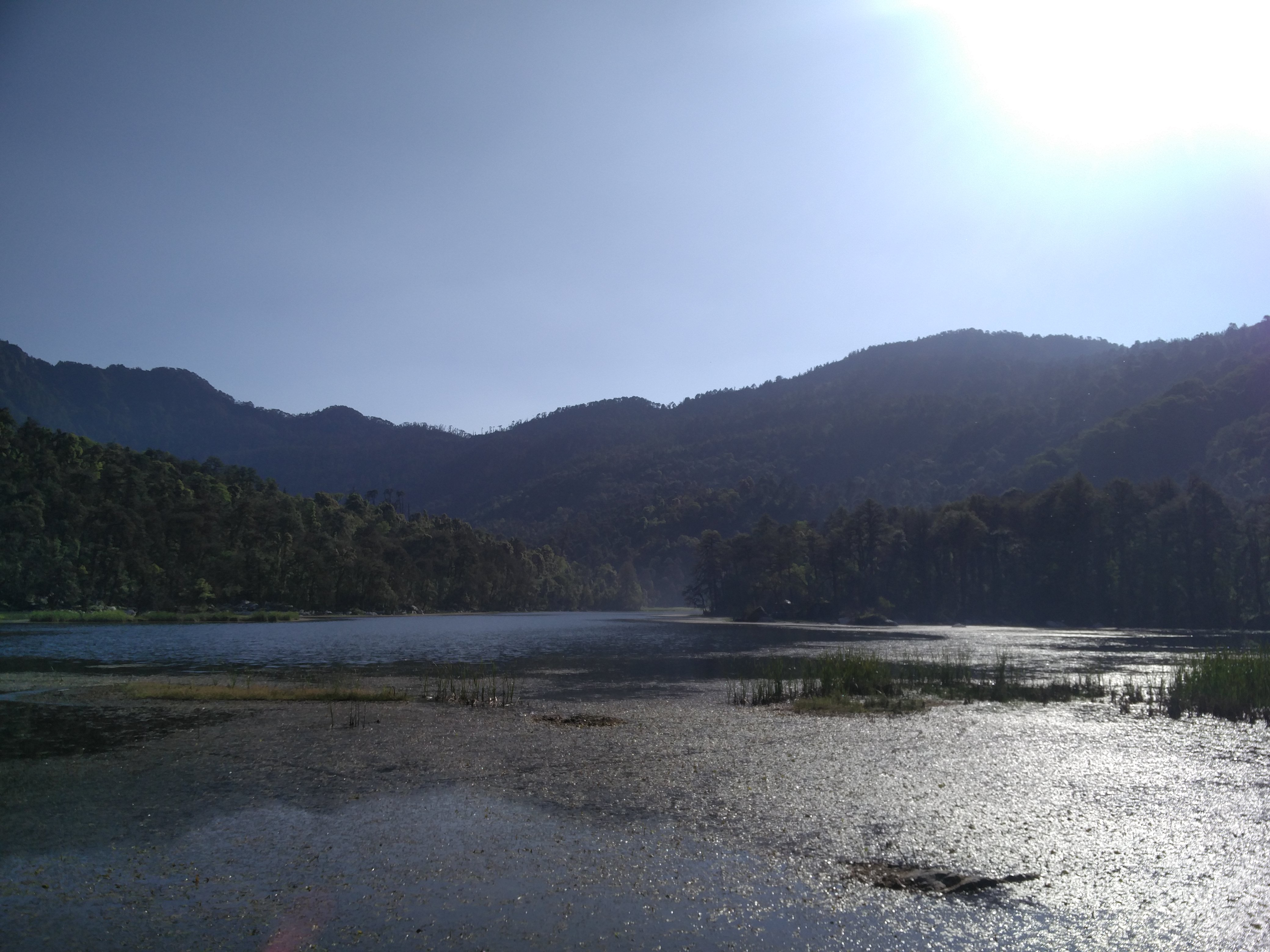

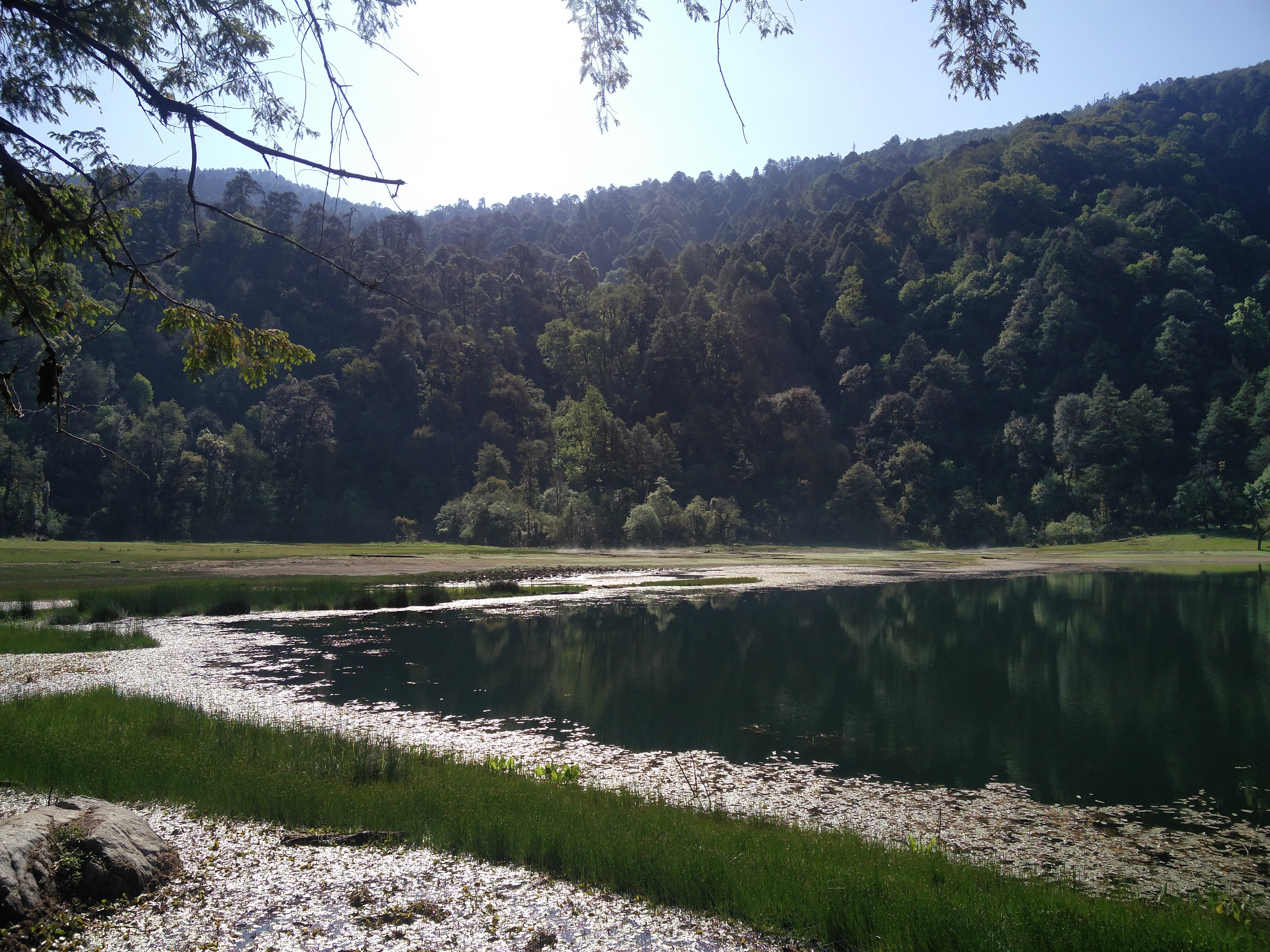

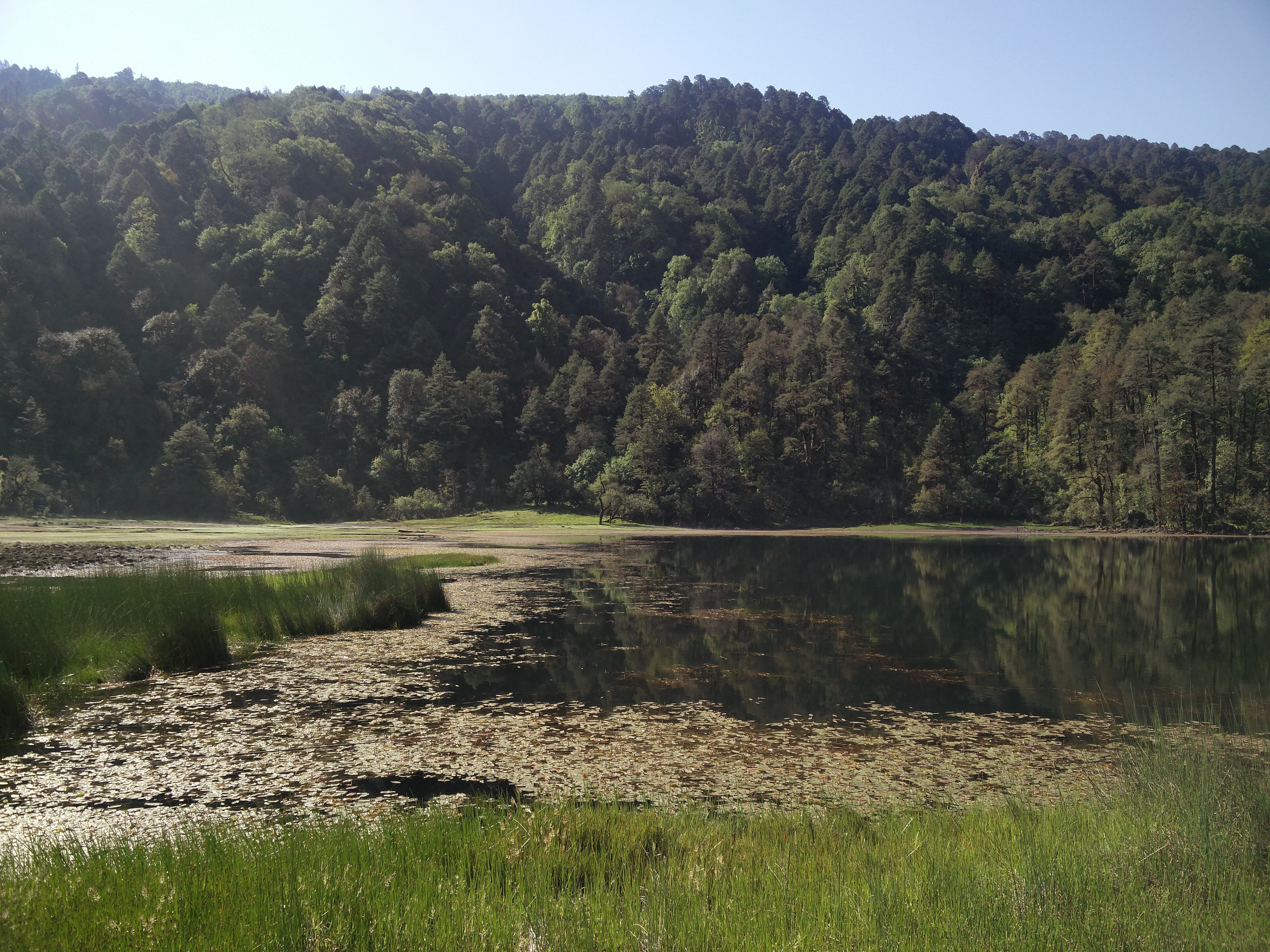

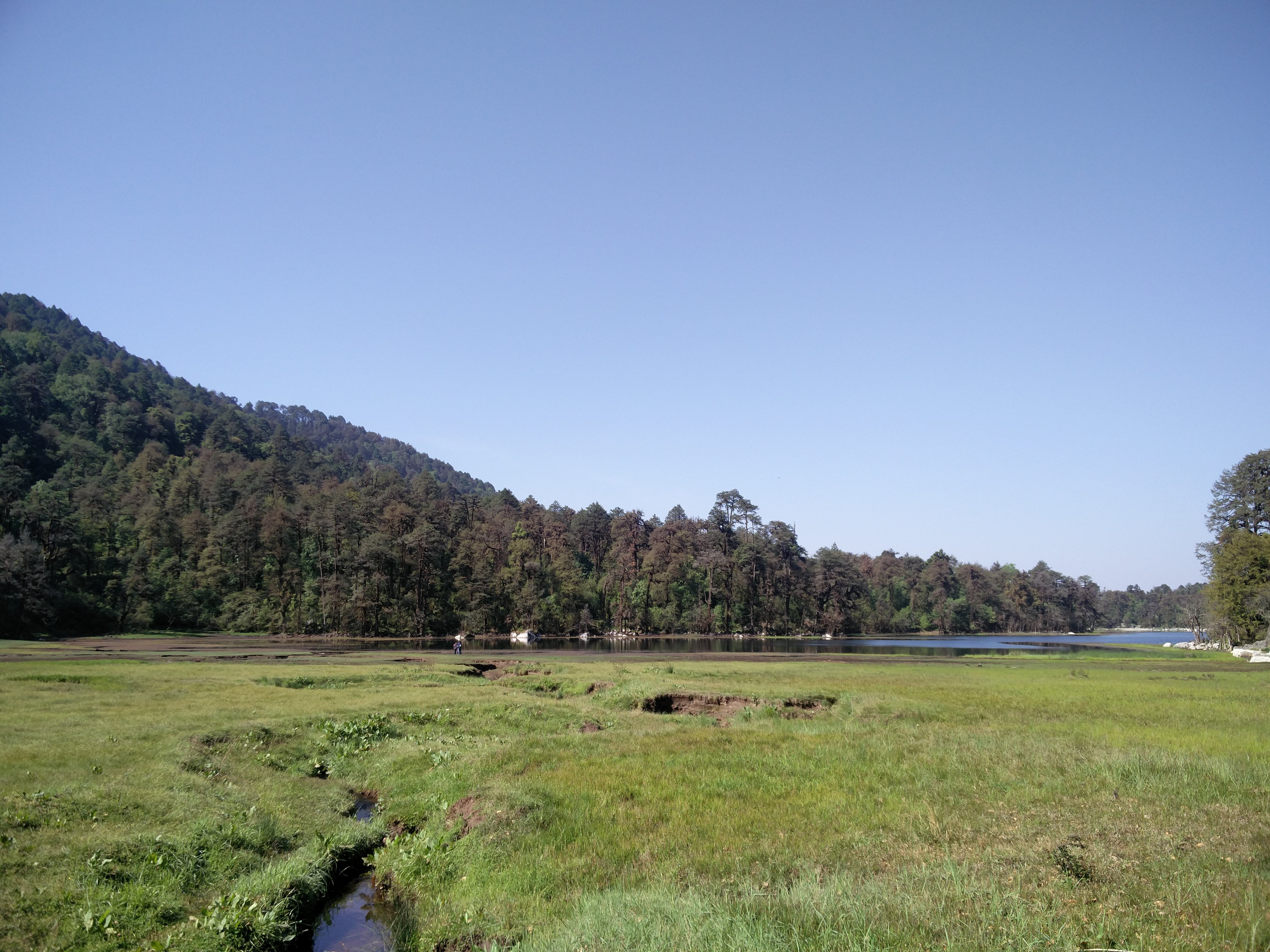

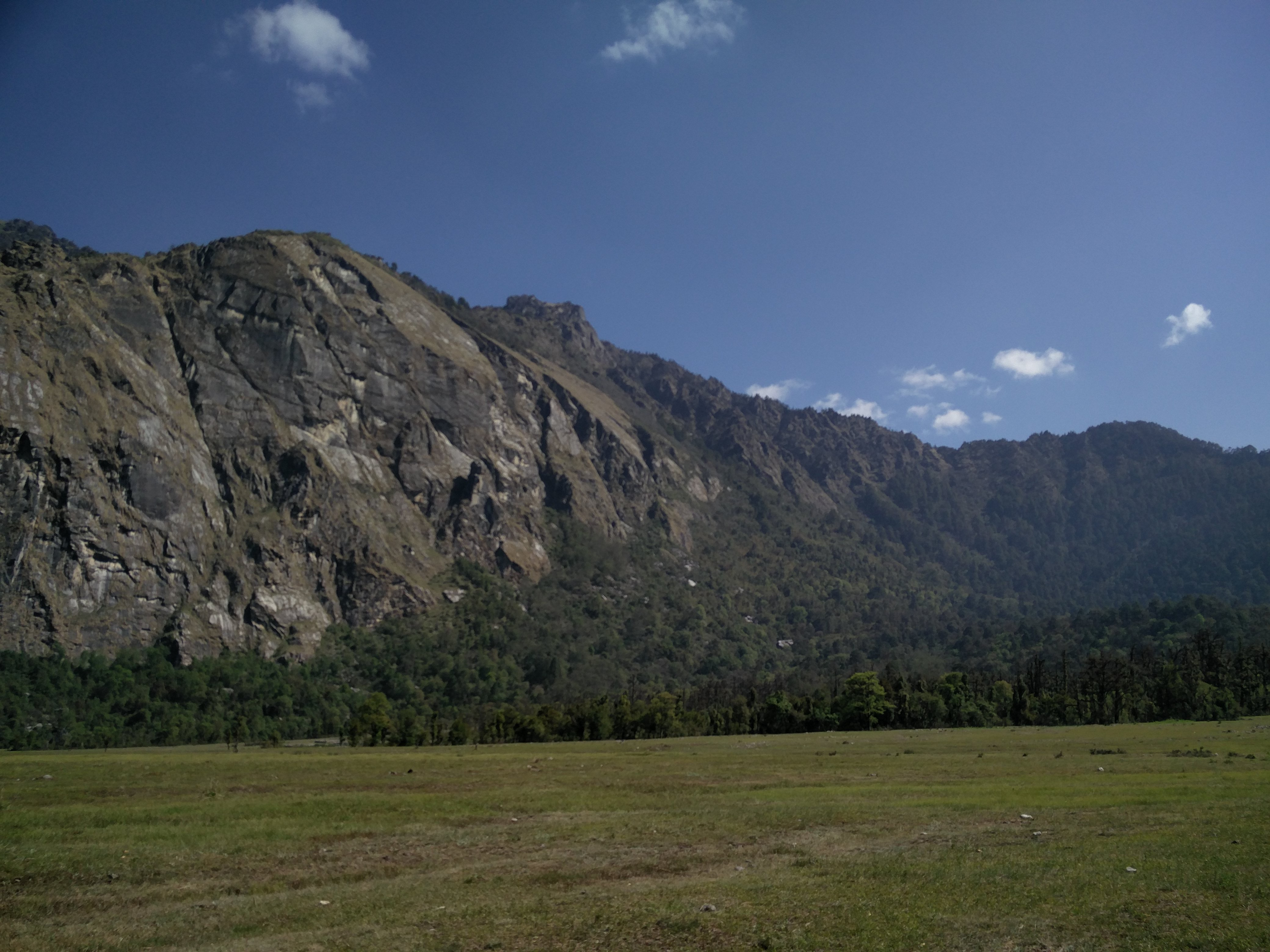

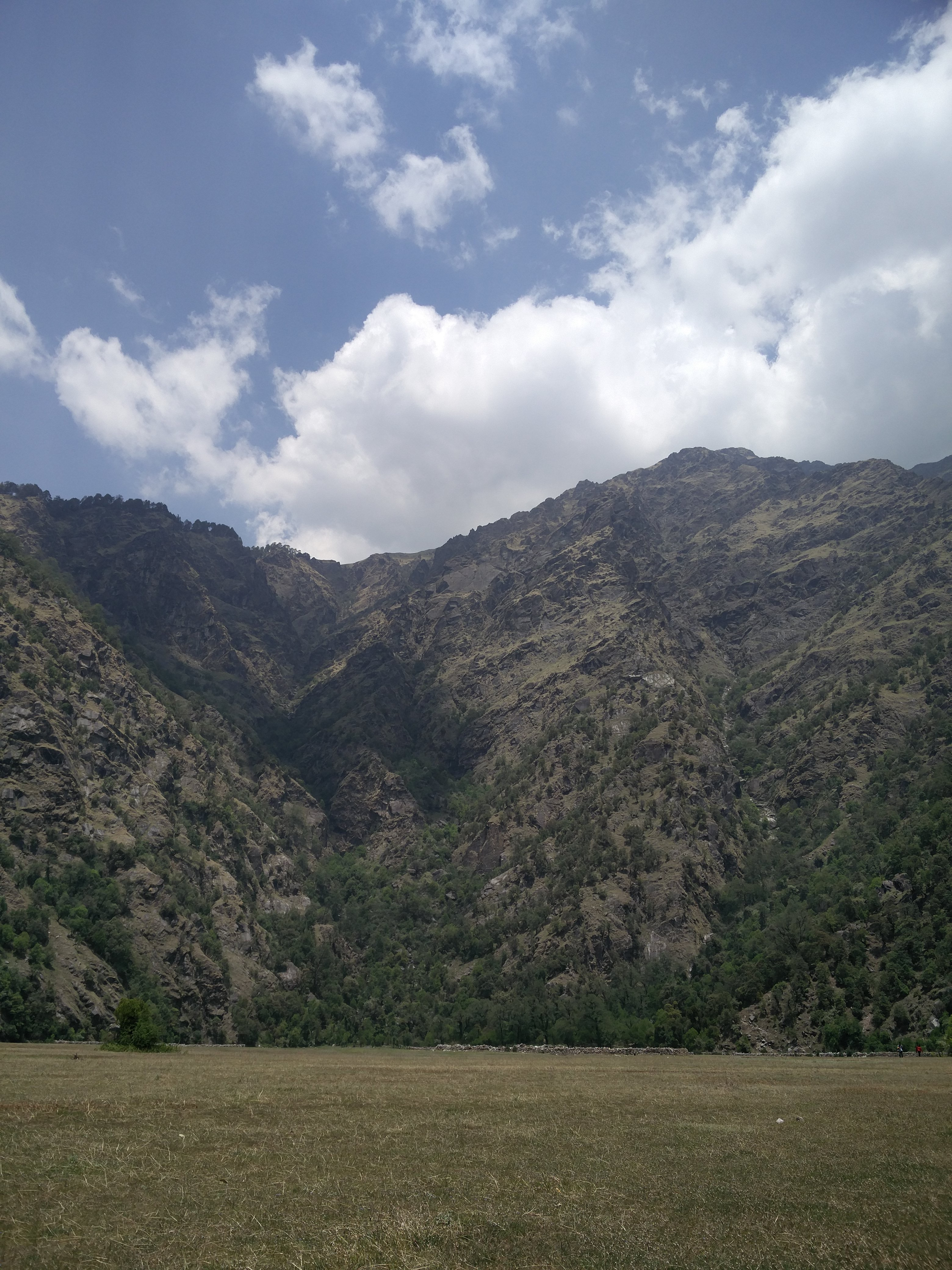

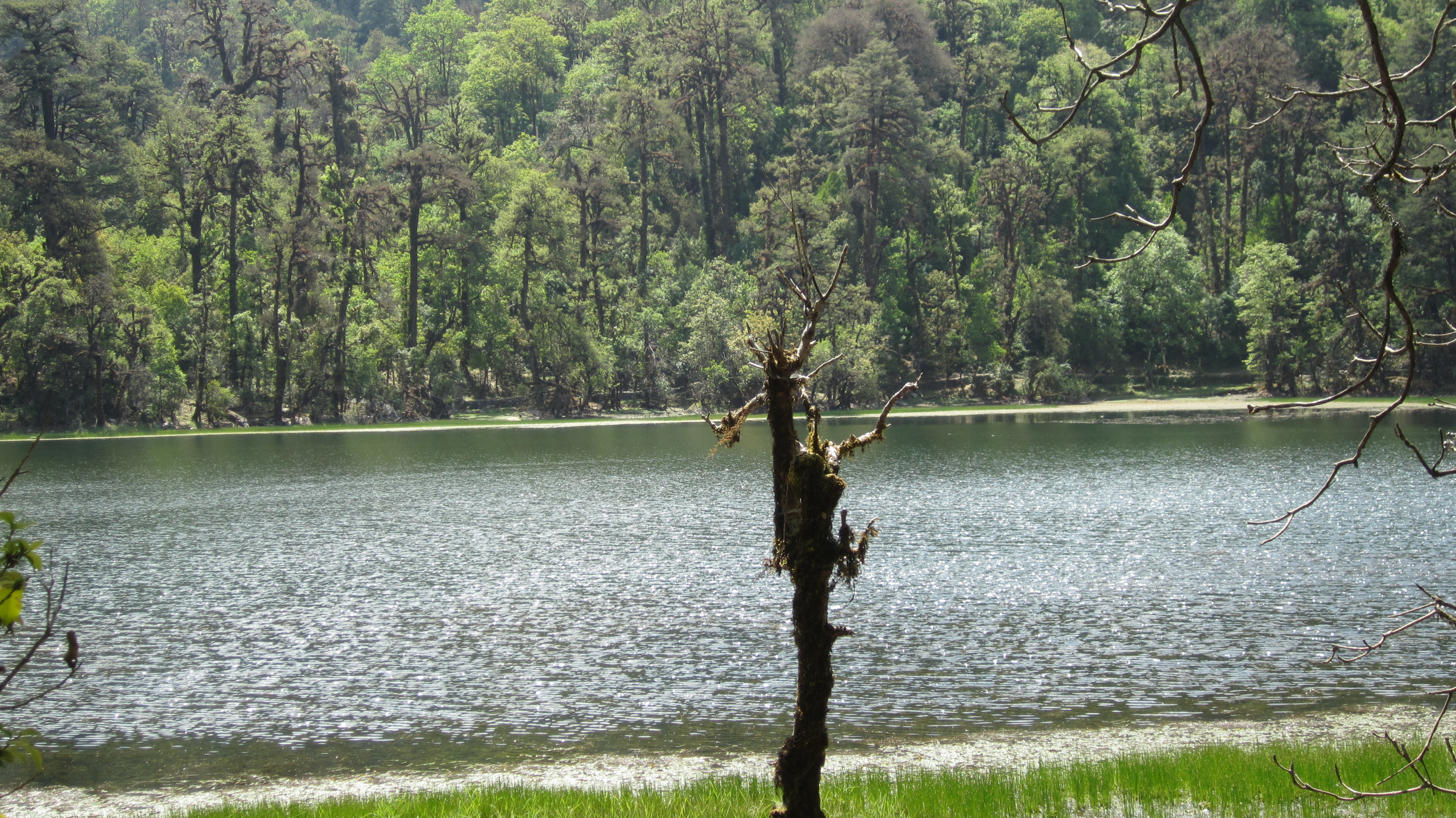

== See also ==
- List of lakes of Nepal
