= Nadine Ramaroson =

French-born Malagasy politician (1958 – 2011)

- Born: 28 May 1958; France
- Died: 28 August 2011 (aged 53); Madagascar
- Cause of death: drowning
- Education: Glion Institute of Higher Education
- Occupation: politician

Nadine Ramaroson (May 28, 1958 – August 28, 2011) was a French-born politician in Madagascar who died in a shipwreck. When she died she was a leading figure of the transitional government known for her support for populations who were poor and vulnerable.

== Birth ==
The daughter of André Ramaroson and Odette Andriatsalama, she was born Nadine Laura Eugénie Charlotte Ramaroson in Maisons-Alfort, France. She was the daughter of the founder of Savonnerie Tropicale

== Education ==
She was educated at the Saint Joseph de Cluny elementary school, at the St. Antoine secondary school in Andravoahangy, at the Lycée Français de Tananarive and the École des Roches in France. She continued her studies at the Glion Institute of Higher Education in Switzerland. She then worked at a hotel in Geneva, in the family business Savonnerie tropicale and later started her own import-export company Madisco.

Ramaroson was Minister of Population and Social Affairs from 2009 to 2011.

== Death ==
She drowned in the ocean near Soanierana Ivongo while returning from the Whale Festival at Île Sainte-Marie. The boat was apparently overturned by large waves and at least four people on the boat died, including Ramaroson. There was a report that a subsequent explosion had prevented a rescue attempt and caused additional deaths of rescuers.
