= Khaptad National Park =

National Park of Nepal

- Nepali: खप्तड राष्ट्रिय निकुञ्ज
- IUCN category II (national park)
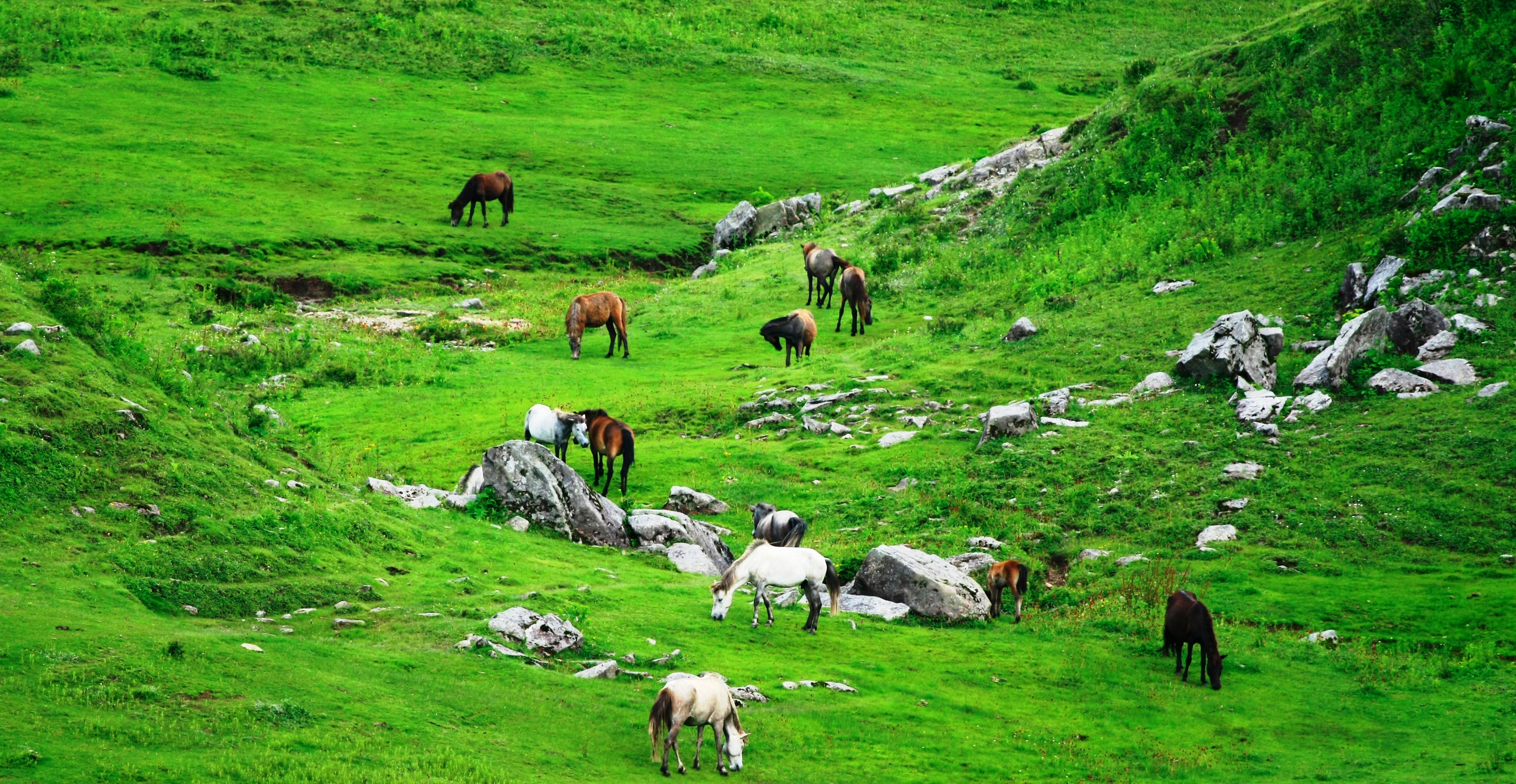

- Location within Sudurpashchim Province Location within Nepal Location within South Asia
- Location: Nepal
- Coordinates: 29°16′12″N 80°59′24″E
- Area: 225 km^{2} (87 sq mi)
- Established: 1984
- Governing body: Department of National Parks and Wildlife Conservation

Khaptad National Park is a national park in the Far-Western Region, Nepal that was established in 1984. Stretching over the four districts of Bajhang, Bajura, Achham and Doti it covers an area of 225 km^{2} (87 sq mi) and ranges in elevation from 1,400 to 3,300 m (4,600 to 10,800 ft).

== History ==
Khaptad National Park was established in 1984 on the advice of Khaptad Baba; a buffer zone of 216 km^{2} (83 sq mi) was declared in 2006.

== Vegetation ==
Khaptad National Park consists of moorland, steep slopes and streams, with 567 floral species. Vegetation types include chir pine-rhododendron forest, oak forest and Himalayan fir-hemlock-oak forest and alder forest in riverine areas. Medicinal plants encompass 224 species.

== Fauna ==
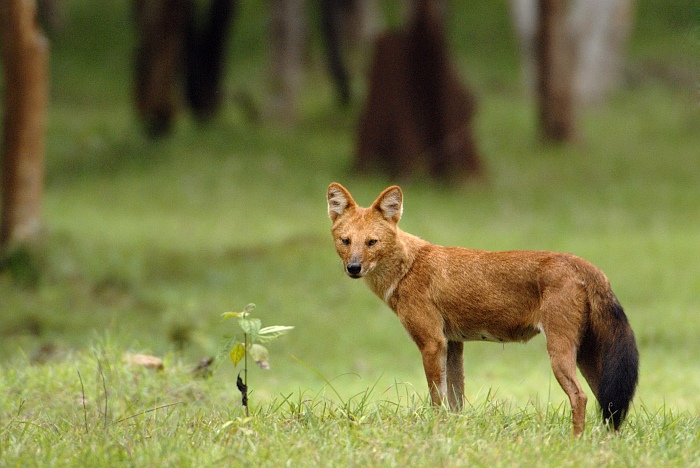
Asiatic wild dog

Khaptad National Park harbours 23 mammals including Indian leopard, Himalayan black bear, dhole and Alpine musk deer; 287 bird species include the Impeyan pheasant, peregrine falcon and white-rumped vulture; 23 amphibians and reptiles have also been recorded.
