= Lamjung Himal =

Mountain in Nepal

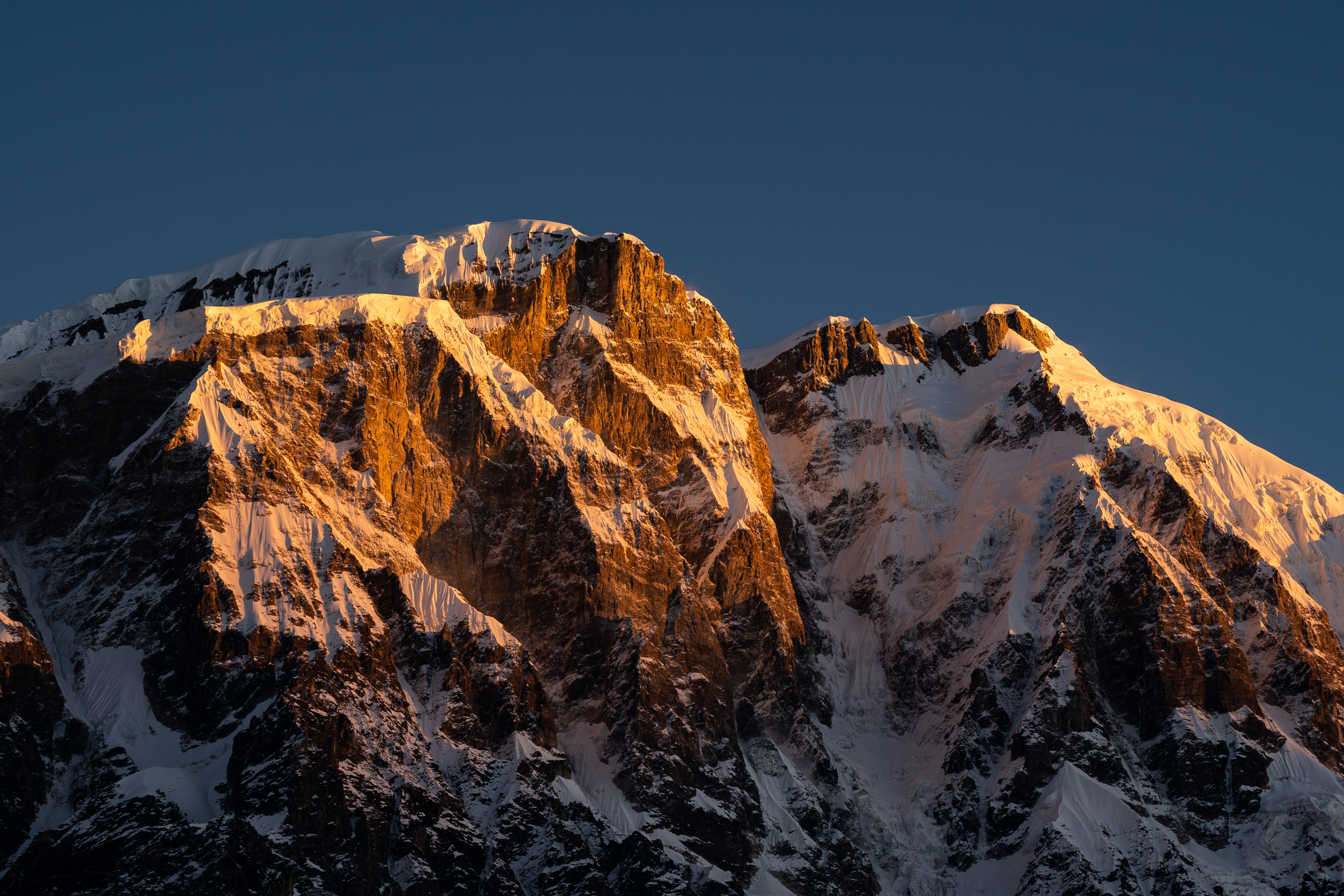
- Lamjung Himal

Highest point
- Elevation: 6,983 m (22,910 ft)
- Prominence: 550 m (1,800 ft)
- Isolation: 8.24 km (5.12 mi)
- Coordinates: 28.489544929348035°N 84.18918965732392°E

Geography
- Location within Gandaki Province Location within Nepal
- Country: Nepal
- Province: Gandaki Province
- District(s): Kaski, and Manang
- Parent range: Annapurna

Climbing
- First ascent: 1974

Lamjung Himal also known as Lamjing Kailas is a mountain located in Gandaki Province, Nepal at an elevation of 6,983 metres (22,910 ft). A subpeak of Annapurna II, Lamjung Himal is the southeasternmost mountain in the Annapurna range. It was first climbed in 1974 by Derrick Chamberlain and Phillip Neame.
