= Bharat Lake =

Man-made lake in Nepal

Bharat/Varat Lake
- Bharat Taal
- भरत ताल (Nepali)
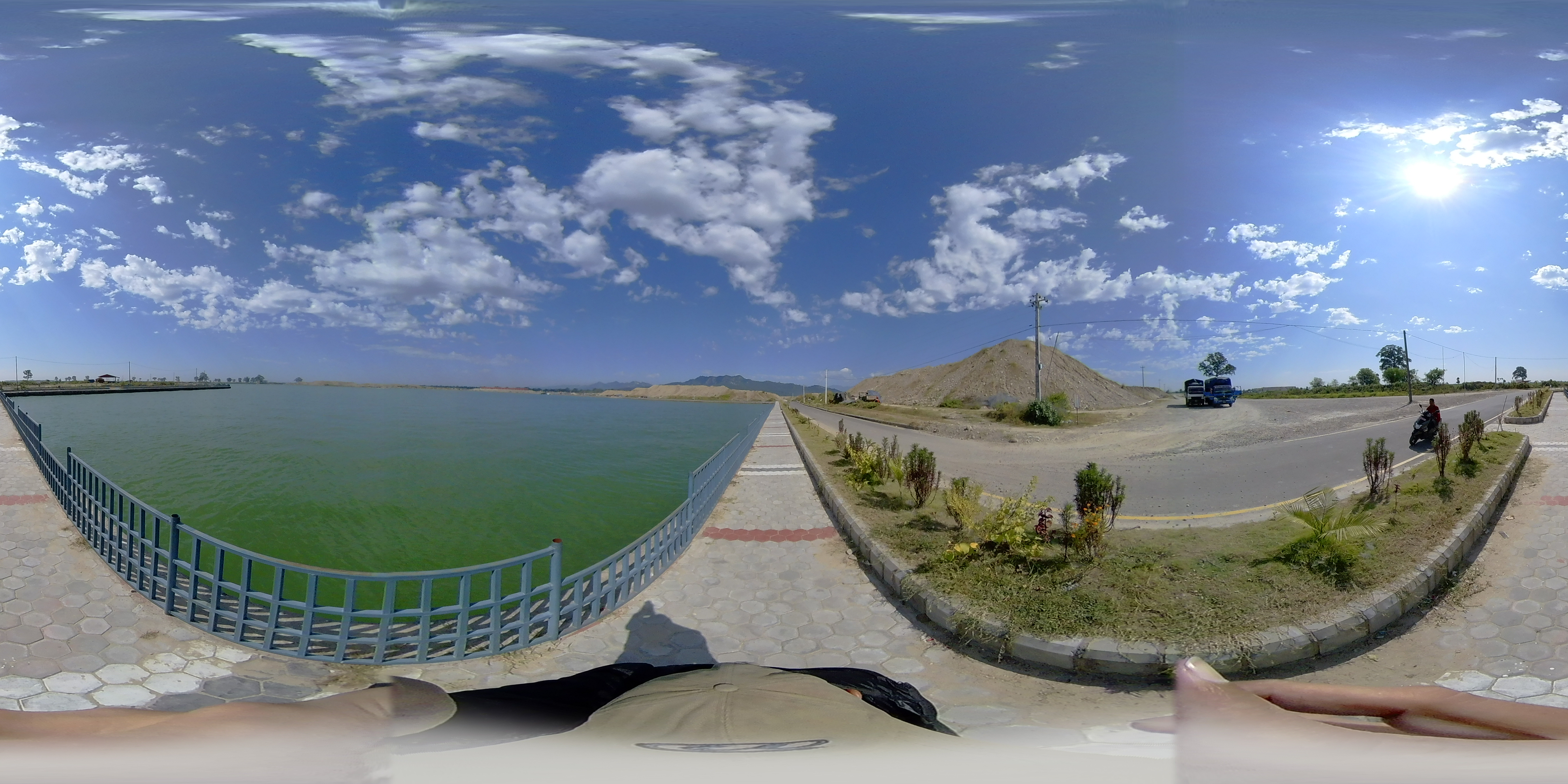
- Bagmati Machha Pokhari

- Location within Madhesh Province
- Location: Madhesh Province
- Coordinates: 27.108°N 85.472°E
- Type: Man-made lake
- Etymology: Bharat Kumar Thapa
- Primary inflows: Bagmati river
- Managing agency: Bagmati Municipality
- Built: 2021
- Surface area: 30 hectares (300,000 m^{2})
- Max. depth: 35 ft (11 m)

Bharat Lake or Bharat Taal (Nepali: भरत ताल) is the second-largest man-made lake in Nepal. It is located in Sarlahi District of Madhesh Province. It covers an area of more than 81 hectares (121 bigha), and is 35 feet deep. It has become a tourist attraction after motorboat and jet boat rides were introduced in 2021.

The lake was named after Bharat Kumar Thapa, a mayor of Bagmati Municipality.
