= Parvati Kunda =

Lake in Nepal

- पार्वती कुण्ड (Nepali)
- Location within Nepal
- Location: Rasuwa District, Nepal
- Coordinates: 28.1697923°N 85.0999524°E
- Designation: Lake
- Surface elevation: 2,550 metres (8,370 ft)

Parvati Kunda (Nepali: पार्वती कुण्ड) is a natural fresh water lake located in Galtang village of Aama Chhodingmo Rural Municipality Ward No.3. Rasuwa District of Nepal. The lake was once blessed by the ancient Guru Rinpoche naming it CHHO PEMA like in India. The lake lies at an altitude of 2550 m and it drains to Parvati river. It was originally called Chhodingmo Kunda. In 2040 BS it was renamed to Parvati Kunda.

The water from the lake is used for drinking purpose by locals. The lake is a natural himalayan wetland.

A festival is celebrated in the lake annually.

An ancient palace of Ghale king lies near the lake.
