= Barju Taal =

Wetland in Nepal

- Chimadi Taal
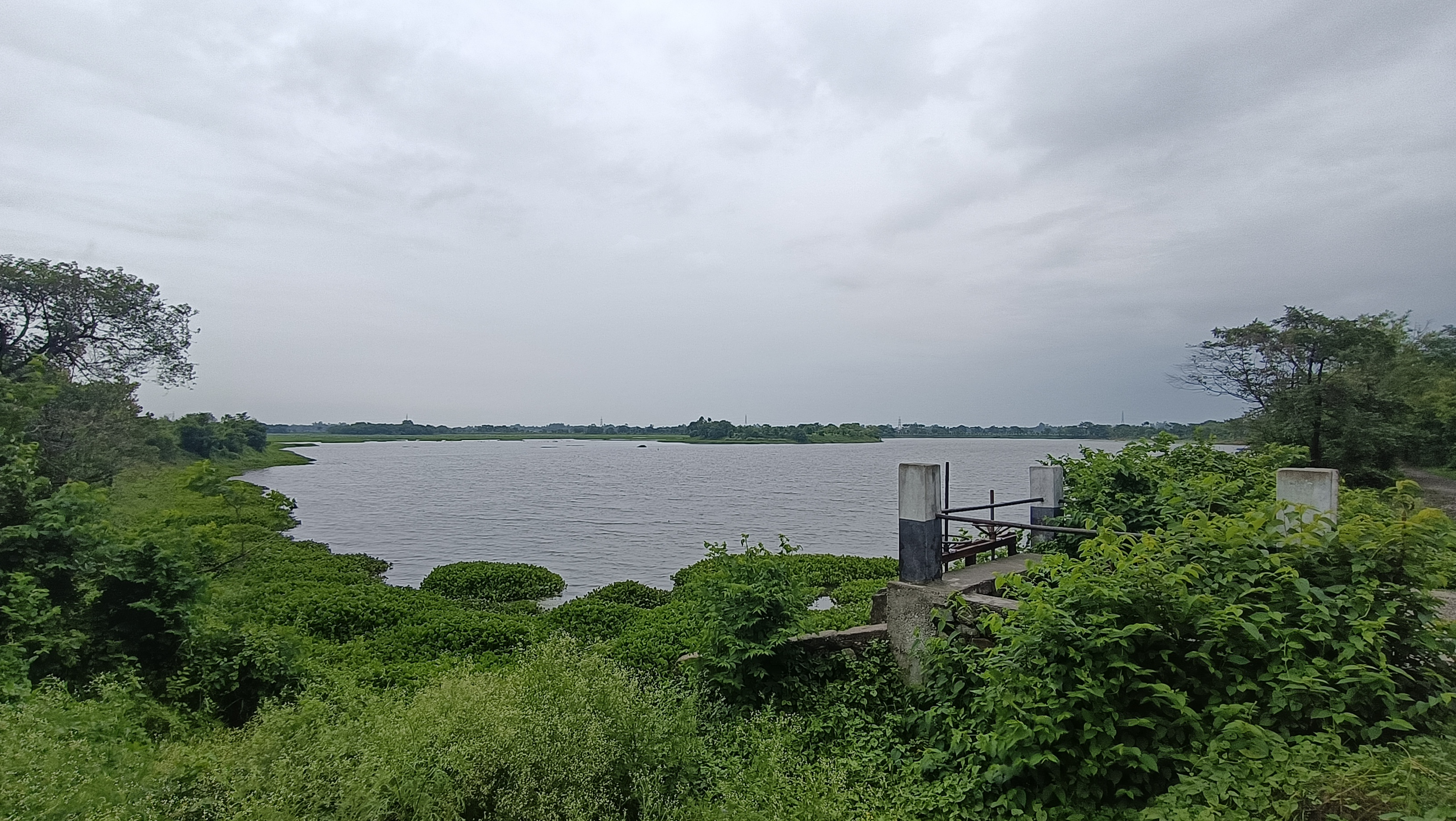
- Barju Taal

- Location within Nepal
- Interactive map of Barju Taal
- Location: Chimdi, Sunsari, Nepal
- Coordinates: 26°29′08″N 87°10′24″E
- Designation: Lake
- Surface elevation: 300 metres (980 ft)

Barju Taal also known as Chimadi Taal is a wetland with a natural lake in Barju rural municipality in Sunsari District in eastern Nepal. The lake is about 12 km from Biratnagar. The lake has been mentioned in the hindu epic of Mahabharta. The lake also form a part of Koshi Tappu Wildlife Reserve.

== Geography ==
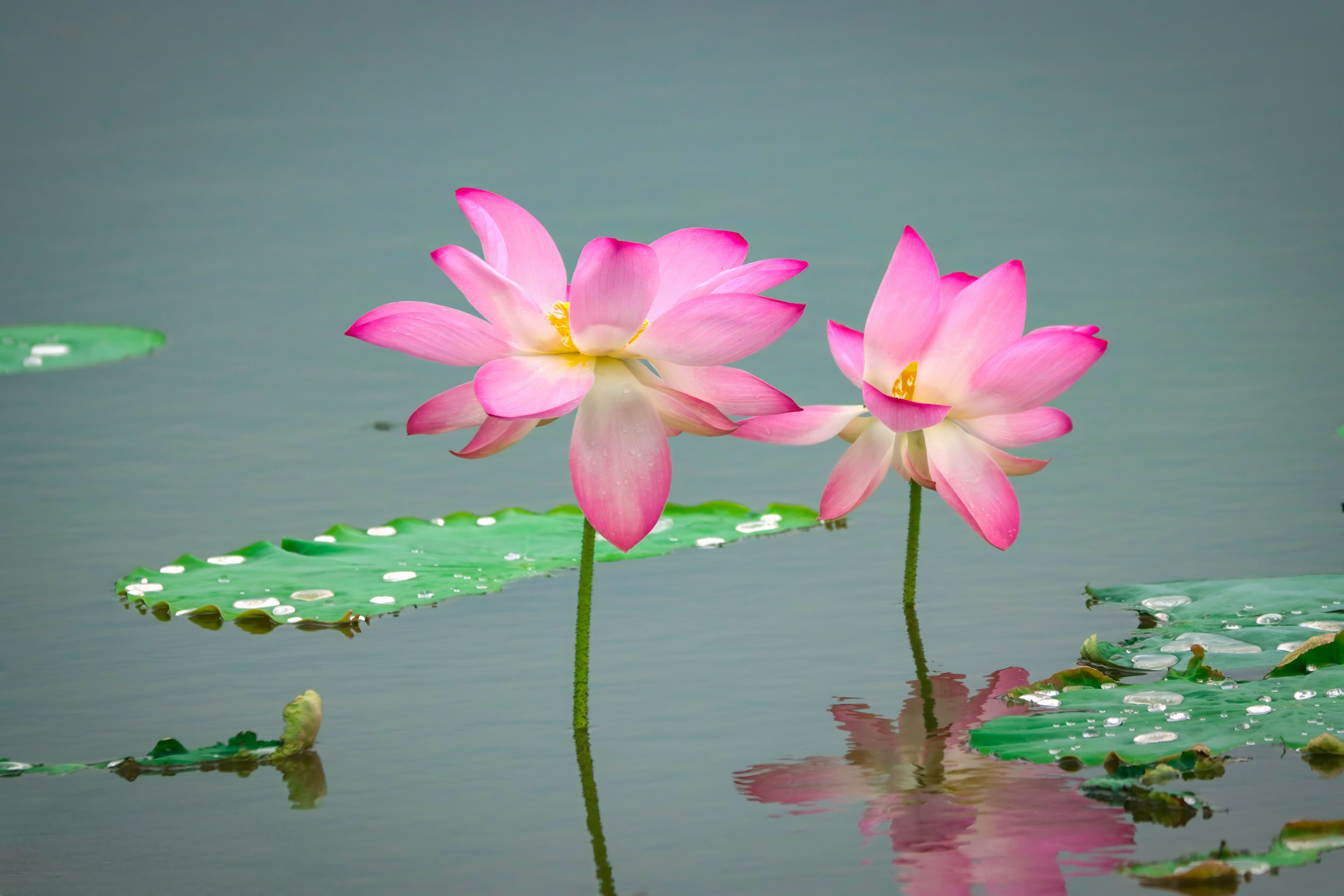
Pink Lotus (Nelumbo nucifera) at Barju Lake, Koshi of Nepal.

The lake has an area of 152 bighas.

The lake has a number of fish species but the number are declining due to excessive fishing by the local fisherman. Further, the encroachment is causing the wetland to shrink.

The wetland also serves for migratory birds. About 100 species have been spotted in this area. The report also shown the increase in number of migratory birds visiting this lake since the start of conservation program in 1996. The flood in the Saptakoshi River in 2008 (failure of saptakoshi eastern embankment) had decreased the number of birds due to destruction of the wetland, however, the number has reached its normal values.
