= Gupha Pokhari =

Pond in Nepal

- Siddha Pokhari, Siddha Marga
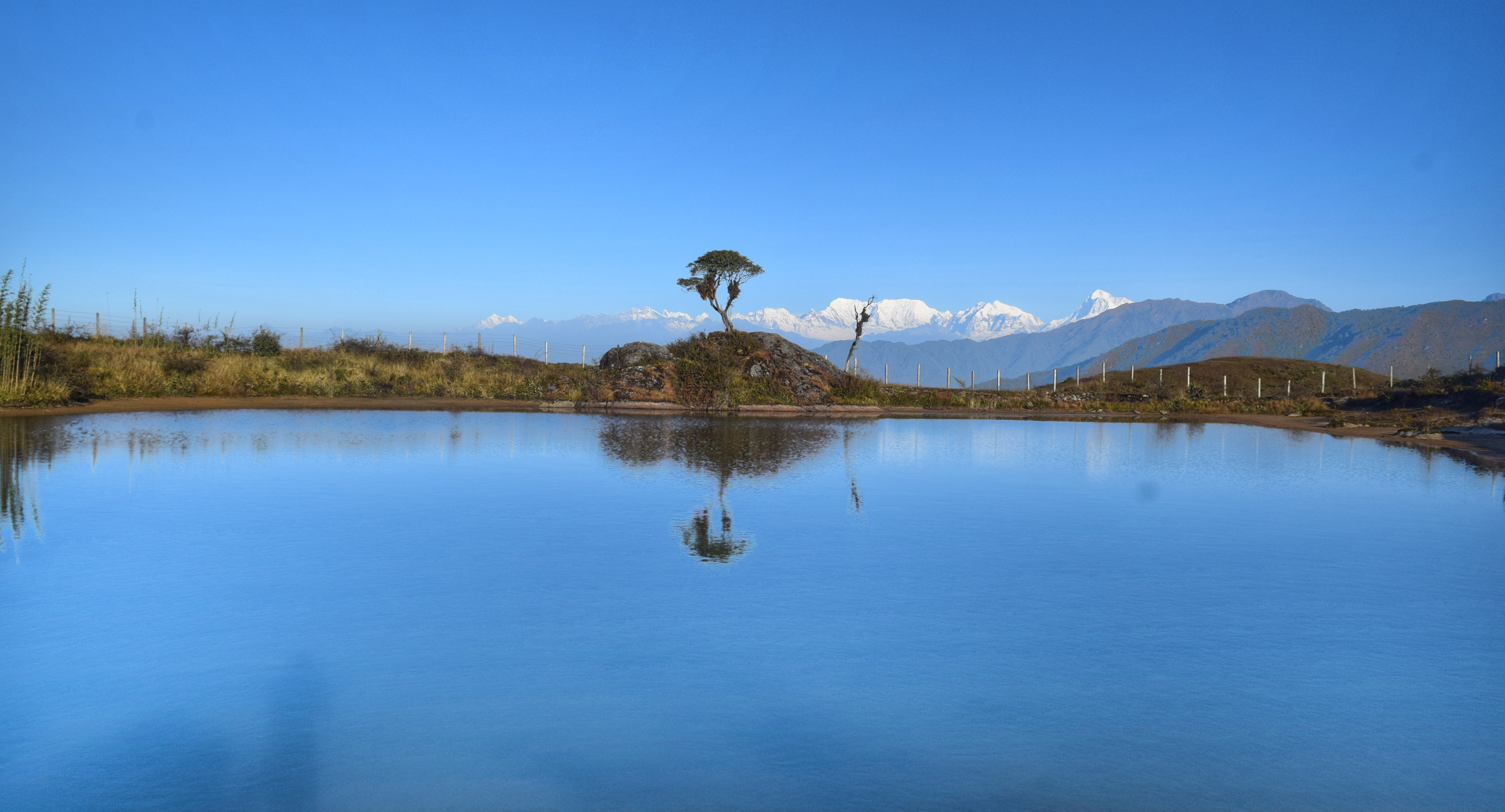
- view of Guphapokhari

- Location within Nepal
- Interactive map of Gupha Pokhari
- Location: Guphapokhari VDC, Sankhuwasabha District, 56900, Nepal
- Coordinates: 27°17′07″N 87°30′23″E
- Lake type: Natural Pond
- Primary inflows: Natural Spring
- Basin countries: Nepal
- Max. depth: 1.5 m (4 ft 11 in)
- Surface elevation: 2,890 metres (9,480 ft)
- Islands: 1

Gupha Pokhari also spelled Gufa Pokhari is a natural pond 2,890 metres (9,480 ft) above sea level in Chainpur Municipality of Sankhuwasabha District of Nepal, and a holy pilgrimage site for Kirat, Hindus and Buddhists.

== History ==
The name "Gupha Pokhari", which means Cave Pond, is a new name given to this in the 20th century, by priests who were believed to meditate in the caves around the hills of this area and gave it its new name. Previously, it was called "Siddha Marga" Pokhari. Locals believe that this pond grants your wishes, similar to the Manakamana Temple in Gorkha.

Guphapokhari is one of the most popular destinations in the Tinjure Milke Jaljale Trail, known as the "Rhododendron capital of Nepal". This region has the highest number of Rhododendron Species, 28 out of 32 found in Nepal. There are also many other flowers and plants, species of birds, species of mammal and views of Makalu, Kangchenjunga and Mt. Everest on a clear day.
