= Ghunchok Pokhari =

- Saurpani Pokhari, Baraha Pokhari, Varaha Pokhari
- Location within Nepal Location within Tibet
- Location: Gorkha
- Coordinates: 28°07′04″N 84°42′15″E
- Basin countries: Nepal
- Max. length: 2 km (1.2 mi)
- Max. width: 2 km (1.2 mi)
- Surface area: 4.23 km^{2} (1.6 sq mi)
- Average depth: 5.6 m (18 ft)
- Max. depth: 8 m (26 ft)

Ghunchok Pokhari, or Saurpani Pokhari is a freshwater lake located in northern-central Nepal. Saurpani Village Development Committee in Gorkha District. It is in fact palustrine wetland, covered by vegetation. Ghunchok Pokhari lake is located at an altitude of more than 1900 m.

== History ==
Ghunchok Pokhari is also famous for the Baraha Temple of the Goddess Durga (Barahi). Nowadays water of lake is getting low and local people making play ground around the lake.
