= Ali Taal (Dadeldhura) =

Lake in Sudurpashchim Province, Nepal

- Location within Nepal
- Location: Dadeldhura, Nepal
- Coordinates: 29.09°N 80.49°E
- River sources: Rangun
- Designation: Lake
- Surface elevation: 800 metres (2,600 ft)

Ali Taal is a natural lake in Alital rural municipality in Dadeldhura District in Sudurpashchim Province of western Nepal. The lake is about 1175 m long and about 400 m wide The area has been studied for potential tourist attraction. The lake lies in the Rangun watershed. The watershed lies in the Siwaliks along the Mahakali River basin.

Recently in 2019, a hindu temple of the lord Bhagwati was constructed to promote tourism in this area.
