= Tilicho Lake =

Glacial lake in the Manang district of Nepal

Tilicho lake
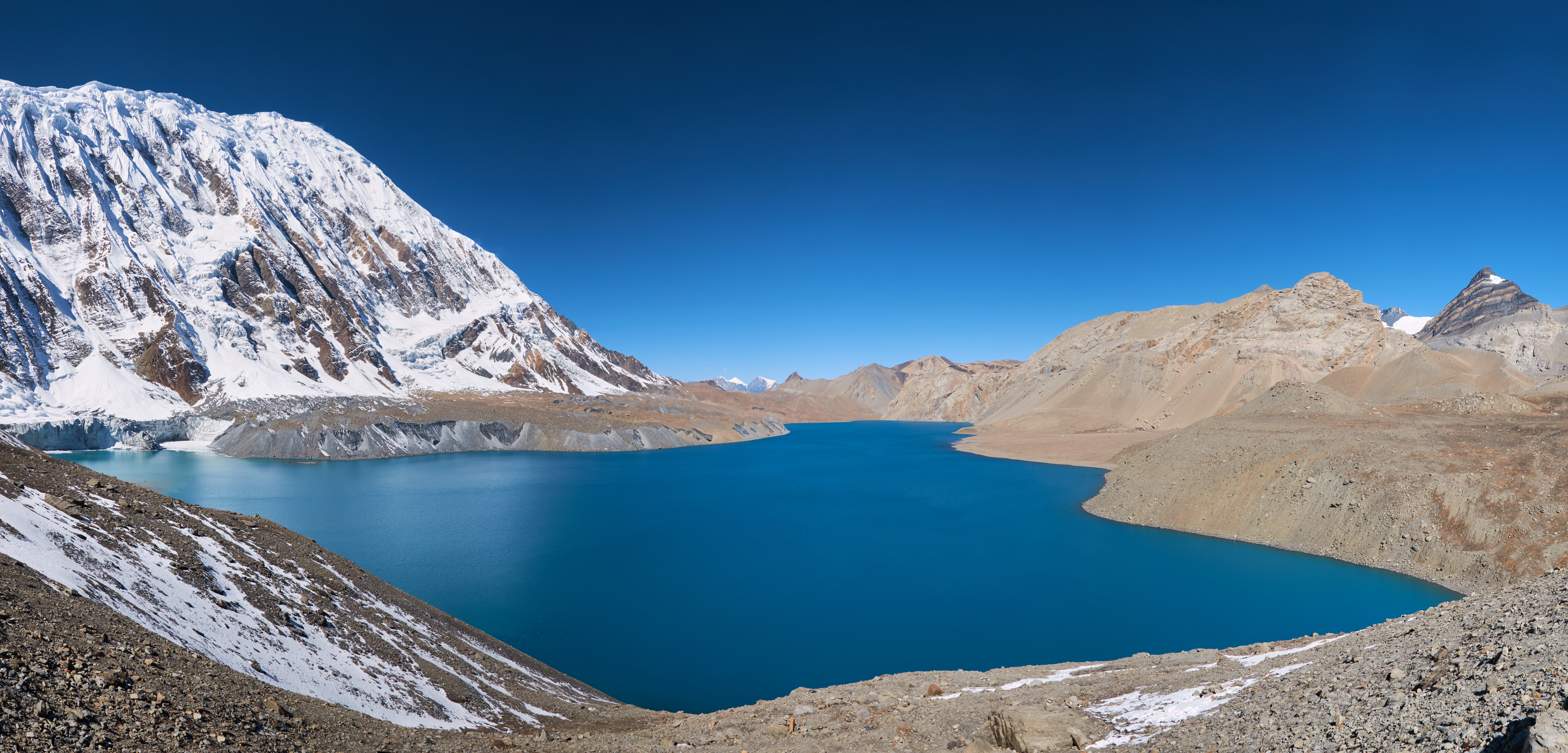

- Location in Nepal
- Interactive map of Tilicho lake
- Location: Annapurna, Manang, Nepal
- Coordinates: 28°41′30″N 83°51′10″E
- Type: Glacial lake
- Basin countries: Nepal
- Max. length: 4 km (2.5 mi)
- Max. width: 1.2 km (0.75 mi)
- Surface area: 4.8 km^{2} (1.9 sq mi)
- Average depth: 85 m (279 ft)
- Water volume: 156×10^{6} L (41,000,000 US gal) (Fresh Water)
- Surface elevation: 4,919 m (16,138 ft)

Tilicho Lake (Nepali: तिलिचो ताल; pronounced [tilit͡so]) is a glacial lake in Manang district of Nepal at an elevation of 4,919 m (16,138 ft) in the Annapurna range of the Himalayas. Another source lists the elevation of the lake as 4,949 m (16,237 ft). According to the Nepali Department of Hydrology and Meteorology, no aquatic organism has been recorded in the lake as of 2003.

Tilicho Lake was the site of the highest ever altitude scuba dives. A Russian diving team, consisting of Andrei Andryushin, Denis Bakin, and Maxim Gresko, conducted a scuba dive in the lake in 2000.

== Religious significance ==
Hindus believe that Tilicho Lake is the ancient Kak Bhusundi Lake mentioned in the epic Ramayana. The sage Kak Bhusundi is believed to have first told the happenings of Ramayana to Garuda - king of birds, near this lake. The sage took the form of a crow while telling the story to Garuda. Crow translates to Kak in Sanskrit, hence the name Kak Bhusndi for the sage.

== Ecology and biodiversity ==
According to several studies it is believed that there are no aquatic organisms in Tilicho Lake but the surrounding alpine zone is home to species such as Himalayan snowcock, ibex, and mosses adapted to extreme altitudes.

== See also ==
- Gurudongmar Lake
- Lake Tsongmo
- Licancabur
