= Himalayas =

Mountain range in Asia

The Himalayas
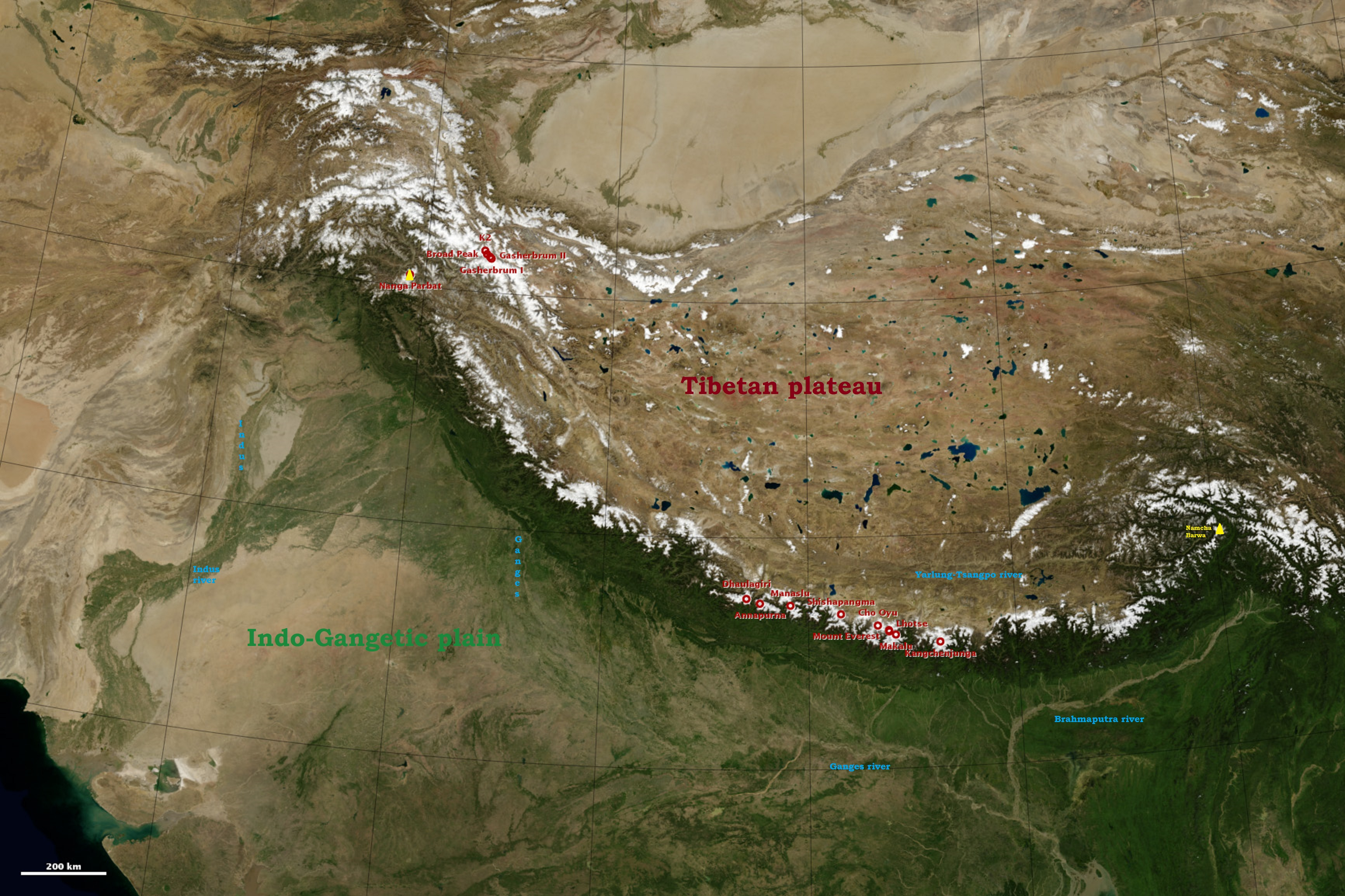
- The arc of the Himalayas (also Hindu Kush and Karakorams) showing the eight-thousanders (in red); Indo-Gangetic Plain; Tibetan Plateau and Tarim Basin; rivers Indus, Ganges, and Yarlung Tsangpo-Brahmaputra; and the two anchors of the range (in yellow)

Highest point
- Peak: Mount Everest, Nepal / China
- Elevation: 8,848.86 m (29,031.7 ft)
- Coordinates: 27°59′N 86°55′E

Dimensions
- Length: 2,400 km (1,500 mi)

Geography
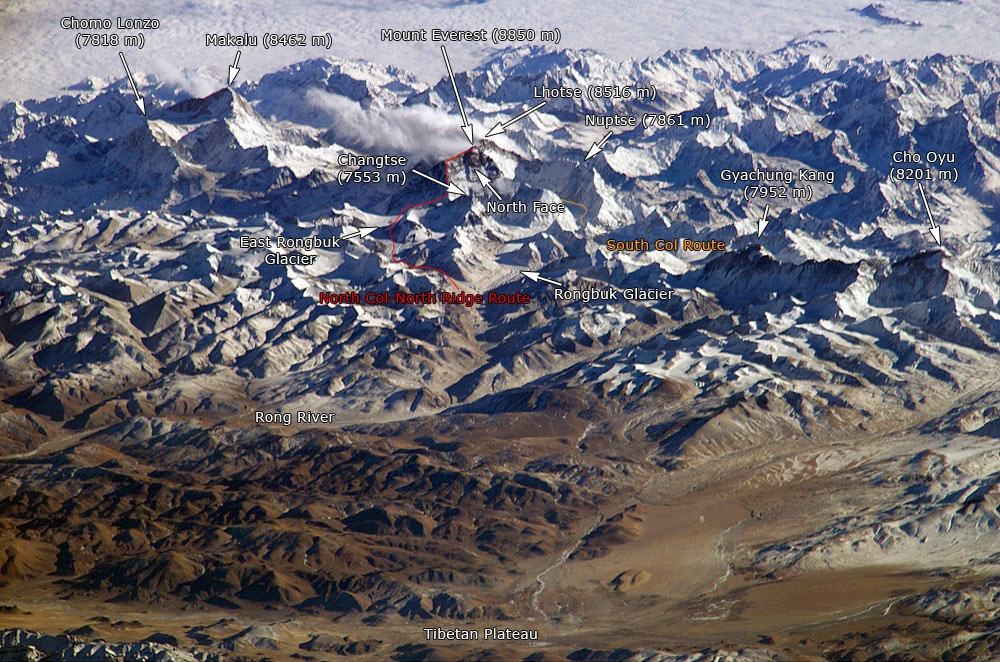
- Mount Everest and surrounding peaks as seen from the north-northwest over the Tibetan Plateau. Four eight-thousanders can be seen, Makalu (8,462 m), Everest (8,848 m), Cho Oyu (8,201 m), and Lhotse (8,516 m).
- Countries: Bhutan; China; India; Nepal; Pakistan; (Note: Sovereignty over the range is contested in several places, most notably in the Kashmir region.)
- Continent: Asia

Geology
- Orogeny: Alpine orogeny
- Rock age: Cretaceous to Cenozoic
- Rock types: Metamorphic; sedimentary

The Himalayas, (Note: They are also known as "the Himalaya Mountains". In western literature, some writers refer to it as the Himalaya not changed in English. Other names: سلسلہ کوہ ہمالیہ in Urdu, হিমালয় পর্বতমালা Himaloẏ Porbōtmala in Bengali, simplified Chinese: 喜马拉雅山脉; traditional Chinese: 喜馬拉雅山脉; pinyin: Xǐmǎlāyǎ Shānmài in Chinese.) or Himalaya, (Note: /ˌhɪməˈleɪ.ə, hɪˈmɑːləjə/ HIM-ə-LAY-ə, hih-MAH-lə-yə; pronounced in Sanskrit: [ɦɪmaːlɐjɐ]; from Sanskrit himá 'snow, frost' and ā-laya 'dwelling, abode'),) is a mountain range in Asia separating the plains of the Indian subcontinent from the Tibetan Plateau. The range has some of the highest peaks on Earth, including the highest, Mount Everest. More than 100 peaks exceeding elevations of 7,200 metres (23,600 feet) above sea level lie in the Himalayas.

The Himalayas span five countries: Nepal, India, China, Bhutan, and Pakistan. The sovereignty of the range in the Kashmir region is disputed among India, Pakistan, and China. The Himalayan range is bordered on the northwest by the Karakoram and Hindu Kush ranges, on the north by the Tibetan Plateau, and on the south by the Indo-Gangetic Plain. Some of the world's major rivers, the Indus, the Ganges, and the Tsangpo–Brahmaputra, rise in the vicinity of the Himalayas, and their combined drainage basin is home to some 600 million people; 53 million people live in the Himalayas. The Himalayas have profoundly shaped the cultures of South Asia and Tibet. Many Himalayan peaks are sacred in Hinduism and Buddhism. The summits of several are off-limits to climbers. These include Kangchenjunga (from the Indian side), Gangkhar Puensum, Machapuchare, and Nanda Devi; and Kailash in the geologically distinct, but nearby Tibetan Transhimalaya.

The Himalayas were uplifted after the collision of the Indian tectonic plate with the Eurasian plate, specifically, by the folding, or nappe-formation of the uppermost Indian crust, even as a lower layer continued to push on into Tibet and add thickness to its plateau; the still lower crust, along with the mantle, however, subducted under Eurasia. The Himalayan mountain range runs west-northwest to east-southeast in an arc 2,400 km (1,500 mi) long. Its western anchor, Nanga Parbat, lies just south of the northernmost bend of the Indus River. Its eastern anchor, Namcha Barwa, lies immediately west of the great bend of the Yarlung Tsangpo River. The Indus-Yarlung suture zone, along which the headwaters of these two rivers flow, separates the Himalayas from the Tibetan plateau; the rivers also separate the Himalayas from the Karakorams, the Hindu Kush, and the Transhimalaya. The range varies in width from 350 kilometres (220 miles) in the west to 151 km (94 mi) in the east.

== Etymology ==
The name of the range hails from the Sanskrit Himālaya (हिमालय 'abode of snow'), from hima (हिम 'frost/cold') and ālaya (आलय 'dwelling/house'). The cognates include:

- हिमालय Himālaya in Nepali and Hindi,
- हिंवाळ Hinvāl in Garhwali,
- हिमाल Himāl in Kumaoni,
- ཧི་མ་ལ་ཡ་ Himalaya in Tibetan,
- හිමාලය Himālaya in Sinhala,
- ہمالیہ Himāliya in Urdu,
- হিমালয় Himaloẏ in Bengali,
- 喜马拉雅 or 喜馬拉雅 Xǐmǎlāyǎ in Chinese.

This name was also previously transcribed as Himmaleh, as in Emily Dickinson's poetry and Henry David Thoreau's essays.

The name of the range is sometimes also given as "Himivan" in older writings, including the Sanskrit epic Mahabharata. Himavat (Sanskrit: हिमवत्) or Himavān (Sanskrit: हिमवान्) is a Hindu deity who is the personification of the Himalayan Mountain Range. Other epithets include Sanskrit: हिमराज Himaraja (lit. 'king of snow'), Tibetan: གངས་ཅན་ལྗོངས་ (lit. 'land of snow'), or Sanskrit: पर्वतेश्वर Parvateshwara (lit. 'lord of mountains').

== Geography and key features ==
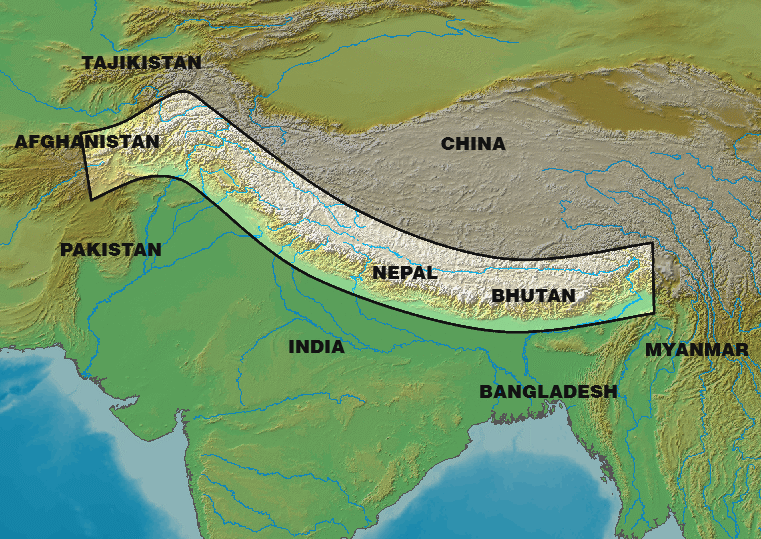
Map of the Himalayas (including the Karakoram and Hindu Kush)

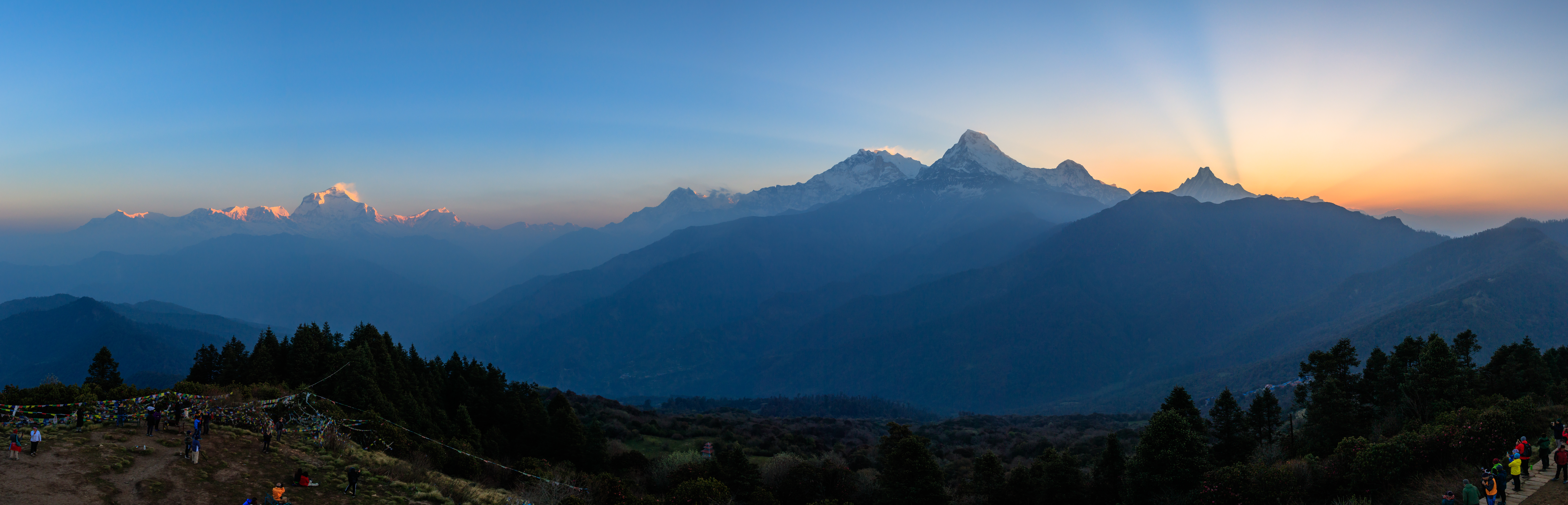
Panoramic view of the Himalayas from Poon Hill in Nepal during sunrise, showing the Dhaulagiri massif (left, shining with alpenglow) and the Annapurna massif (right, with the sun rising from behind). Dhaulagiri and Annapurna, the highest peaks of these massifs, are respectively the seventh and tenth highest mountains in the world, and are two of the world's fourteen eight-thousanders.

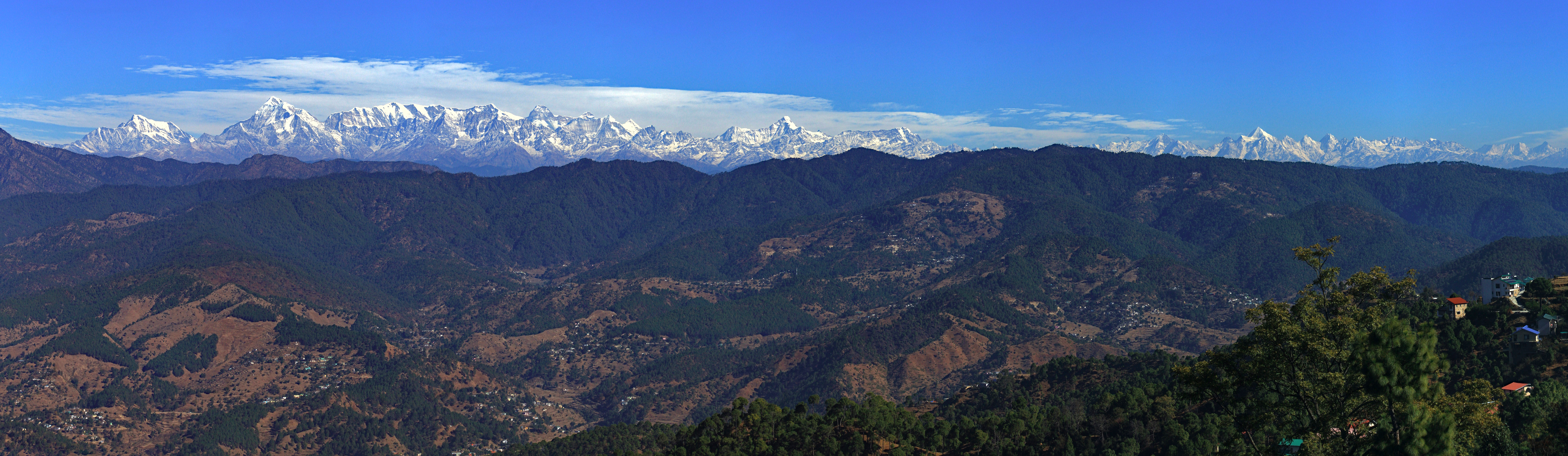
Panorama of the Garhwal and Kumaon Himalayas from Ranikhet, India, showing peaks such as Trisul, Nanda Devi, Nanda Kot and Panchachuli. Nanda Devi is the highest mountain located entirely within India's borders, and the second highest mountain in India after Kangchenjunga (which is the world's third highest and is located along the Indo-Nepalese border).

The Indus River in the foreground and the Nanga Parbat peak, the western anchor of the Himalayas, far in the background, a little faint but towering well above the cloud layer (Note: as seen from a plane approximately above the historic Sawal Dher village, in Khyber Pakhtunkhwa, Pakistan)

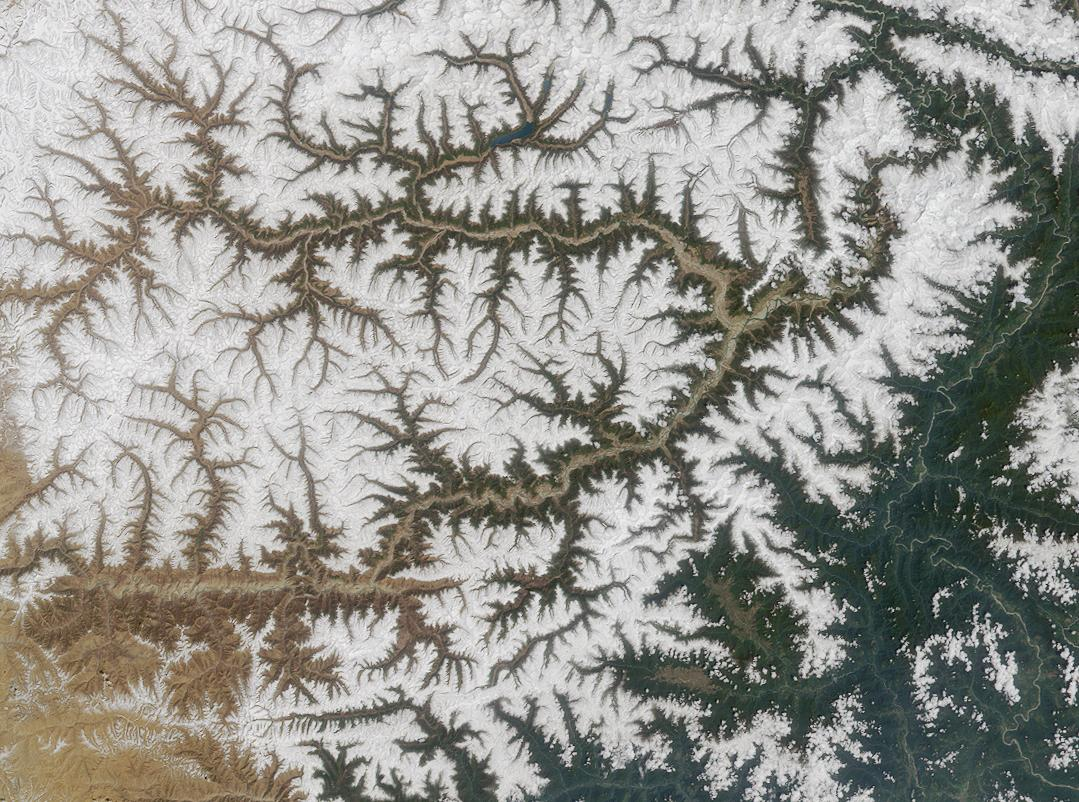
Satellite image of the Namcha Barwa Himal, the eastern syntaxis of the Himalayas, around which the Brahmaputra River (known there as Yarlung Tsangpo) bends, forming the world's deepest canyon

The Himalayas consists of four parallel mountain ranges from south to north: the Sivalik Hills on the south; the Lower Himalayan Range; the Great Himalayas, which is the highest and central range; and the Tibetan Himalayas on the north. The Karakoram are generally considered separate from the Himalayas.

In the middle of the great curve of the Himalayan mountains lie the 8,000 m (26,000-foot) peaks of Dhaulagiri and Annapurna in Nepal, separated by the Kali Gandaki Gorge. The gorge splits the Himalayas into Western and Eastern sections, both ecologically and orographically – the pass at the head of the Kali Gandaki, the Kora La, is the lowest point on the ridgeline between Everest and K2 (the highest peak of the Karakoram range). To the east of Annapurna are the 8,000-metre (26,000-foot; 5.0-mile) peaks of Manaslu and across the border in Tibet, Shishapangma. To the south of these lies Kathmandu, the capital of Nepal and the largest city in the Himalayas. East of the Kathmandu Valley lies the valley of the Bhote/Sun Kosi river which rises in Tibet and provides the main overland route between Nepal and China – the Araniko Highway/China National Highway 318. Further east is the Mahalangur Himal with four of the world's six highest mountains, including the highest: Cho Oyu, Everest, Lhotse, and Makalu. The Khumbu region, popular for trekking, is found here on the south-western approaches to Everest. The Arun river drains the northern slopes of these mountains, before turning south and flowing to the range to the east of Makalu.

In the far east of Nepal, the Himalayas rise to the Kangchenjunga massif on the border with India, the third-highest mountain in the world, the most easterly 8,000-metre (26,000-foot) summit and the highest point of India. The eastern side of Kangchenjunga is in the Indian state of Sikkim. Formerly an independent Kingdom, it lies on the main route from India to Lhasa, Tibet, which passes over the Nathu La pass into Tibet. East of Sikkim lies the ancient Buddhist Kingdom of Bhutan. The highest mountain in Bhutan is Gangkhar Puensum, which is also a strong candidate for the highest unclimbed mountain in the world. The Himalayas here are becoming increasingly rugged, with heavily forested steep valleys. The Himalayas continue, turning slightly northeast, through the Indian State of Arunachal Pradesh as well as Tibet, before reaching their easterly conclusion in the peak of Namche Barwa, situated in Tibet, inside the great bend of the Yarlang Tsangpo river. On the other side of the Tsangpo, to the east, are the Kangri Garpo mountains. The high mountains to the north of the Tsangpo, including Gyala Peri, however, are also sometimes included in the Himalayas.

Going west from Dhaulagiri, Western Nepal is somewhat remote and lacks major high mountains, but is home to Rara Lake, the largest lake in Nepal. The Karnali River rises in Tibet but cuts through the centre of the region. Further west, the border with India follows the Sarda River and provides a trade route into China, where on the Tibetan plateau lies the high peak of Gurla Mandhata. Just across Lake Manasarovar from this lies the sacred Mount Kailash in the Kailash Ranges, which stands close to the source of the four main rivers of Himalayas and is revered in Hinduism, Jainism, Buddhism, Sufism and Bonpo. In Uttarakhand, the Himalayas are regionally divided into the Kumaon and Garhwal Himalayas with the high peaks of Nanda Devi and Kamet. The state is also home to the important pilgrimage destinations of Chota Chaar Dhaam, with Gangotri, the source of the holy river Ganges, Yamunotri, the source of the river Yamuna, and the temples at Badrinath and Kedarnath.

The next Himalayan Indian state, Himachal Pradesh, is noted for its hill stations, particularly Shimla, the summer capital of the British Raj, and Dharamsala, the centre of the Tibetan community and government in exile in India. This area marks the start of the Punjab Himalaya and the Sutlej river, the most easterly of the five tributaries of the Indus, cuts through the range here. Further west, the Himalayas form much of the disputed Indian-administered union territory of Jammu and Kashmir where lie the mountainous Jammu region and the renowned Kashmir Valley with the town and lakes of Srinagar. The Himalayas form most of the south-west portion of the disputed Indian-administered union territory of Ladakh. The twin peaks of Nun Kun are the only mountains over 7,000 metres (23,000 ft; 4.3 miles) in this part of the Himalayas. Finally, the Himalayas reach their western end in the dramatic 8000-metre peak of Nanga Parbat, which rises over 8,000 m (26,000 ft) above the Indus valley and is the most westerly of the 8000-metre summits. The western end terminates at a magnificent point near Nanga Parbat where the Himalayas intersect with the Karakoram and Hindu Kush ranges, in the disputed Pakistani-administered territory of Gilgit-Baltistan. Some portion of the Himalayas, such as the Kaghan Valley, Margalla Hills, and Galyat tract, extend into the Pakistani provinces of Khyber Pakhtunkhwa and Punjab.

== Geology ==
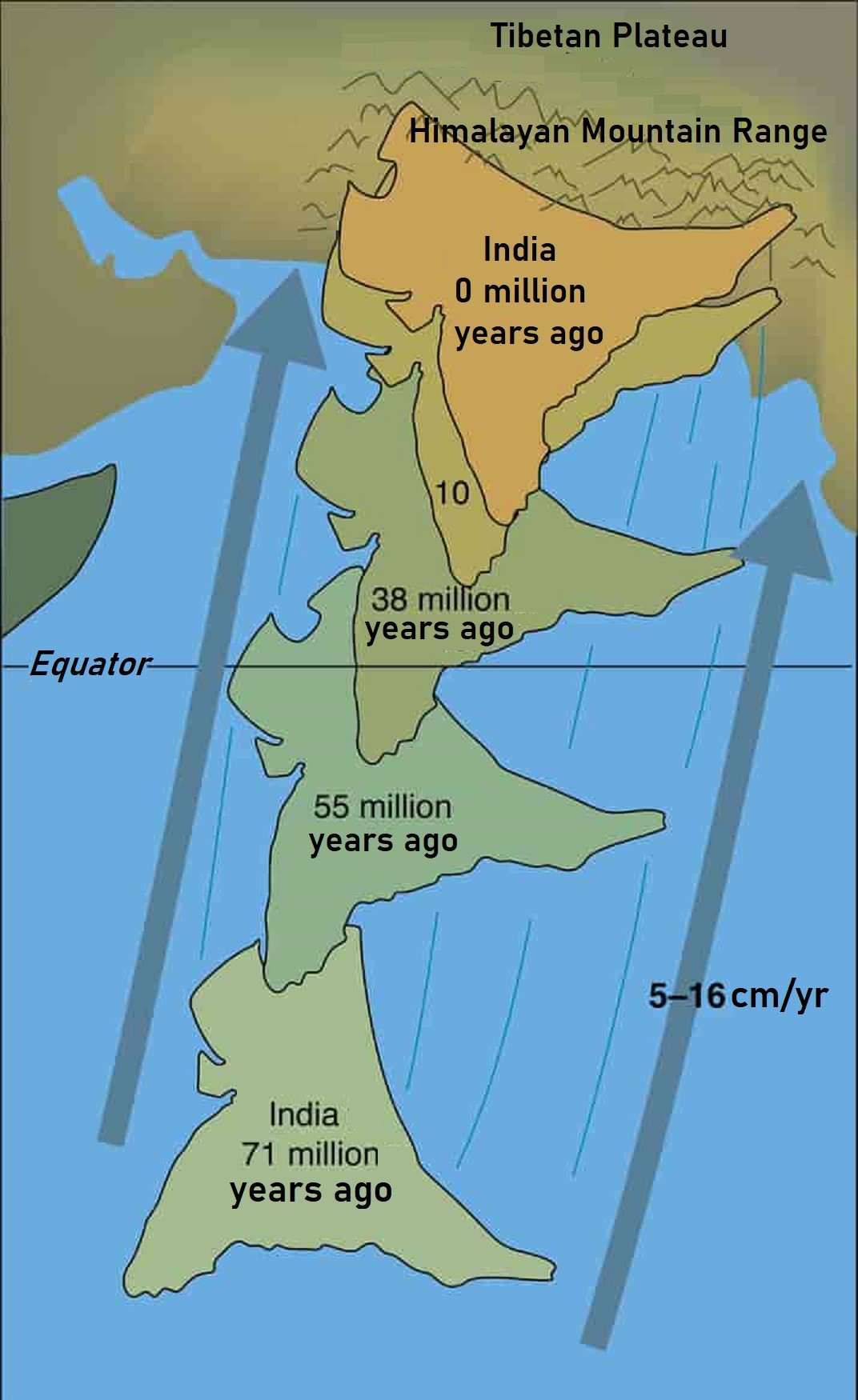
The movement of the Indian plate toward the Eurasian plate starting 71 million years ago at the average speed of 5–15 centimetres (2.0–5.9 in) per year, which closed the Neo-Tethys Ocean above and opened the Indian Ocean below

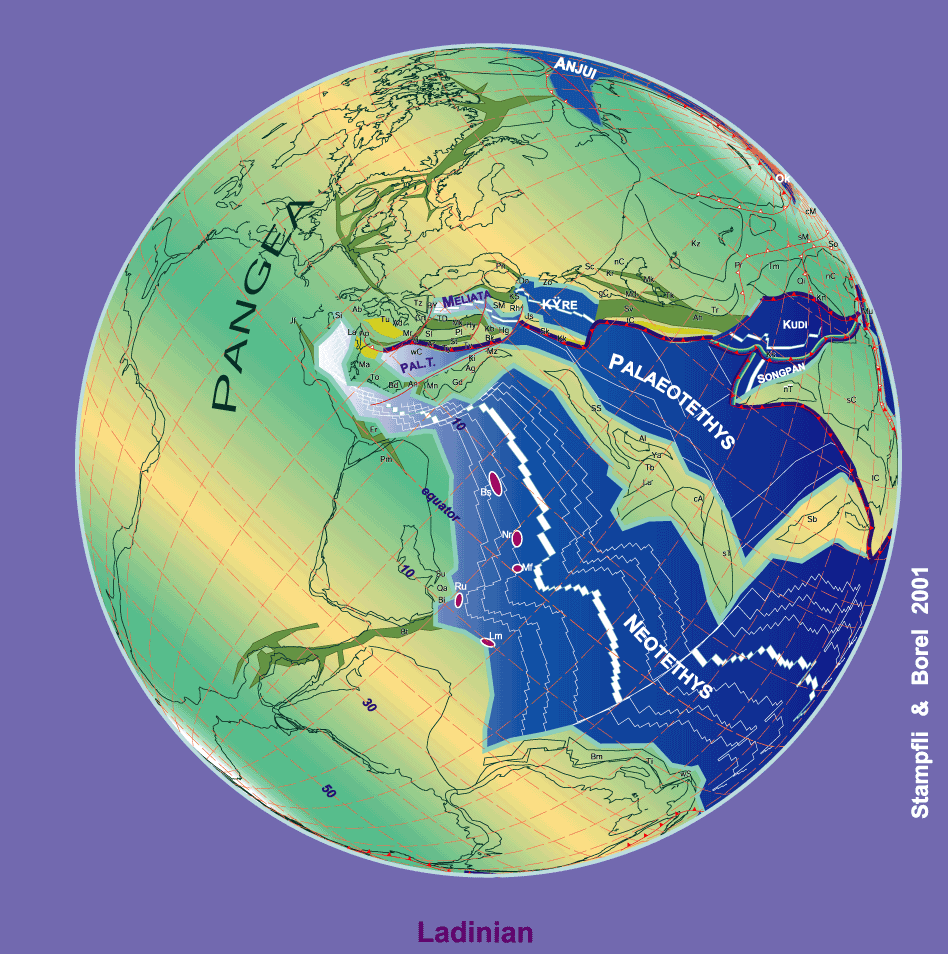
Cimmeria, having rifted from Gondwana shown drifting towards Eurasia, closing the Paleo-Tethys Ocean above, opening the Neo-Tethys Ocean below, and carrying parts of what is today the Tibetan Plateau

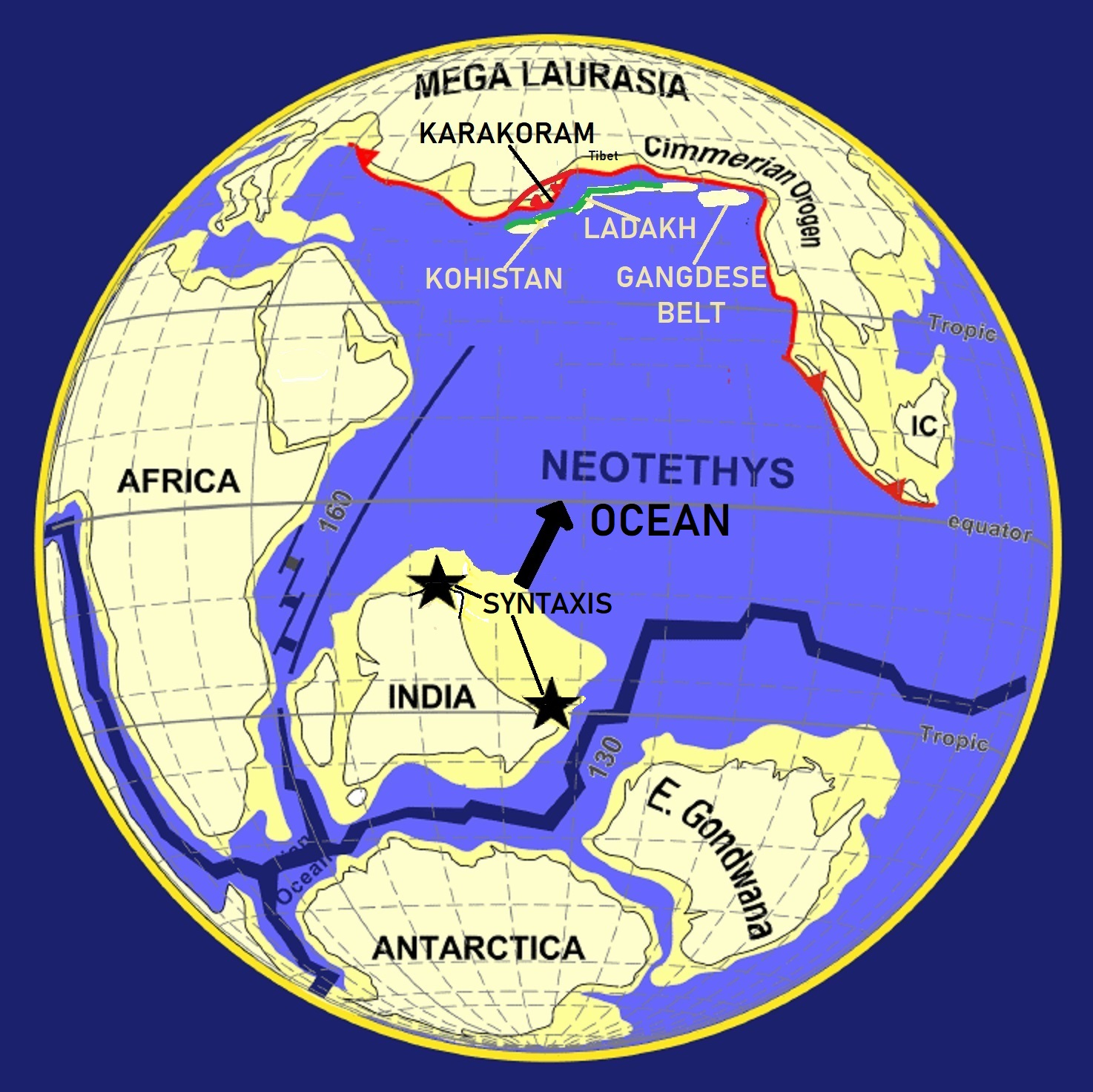
The accretions of the Karakoram, the Kohistan-Ladakh island arc, and the Gangdese belt to Eurasia preceded the final India-Eurasia collision. The stars mark the syntaxis-causing obtrustions.

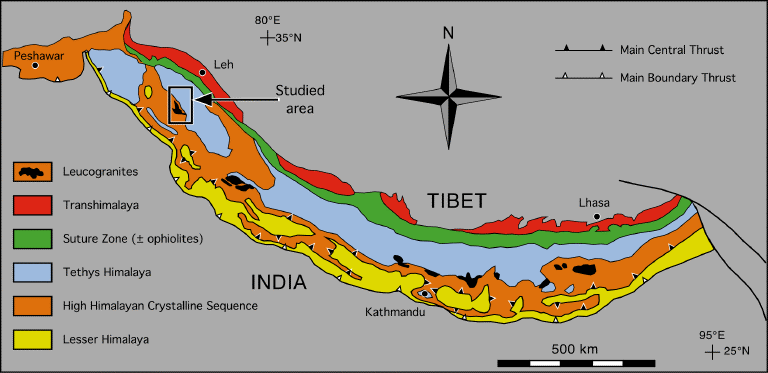
The Indus-Yarlung suture zone, shown in green, separates the Himalayas from the Transhimalaya

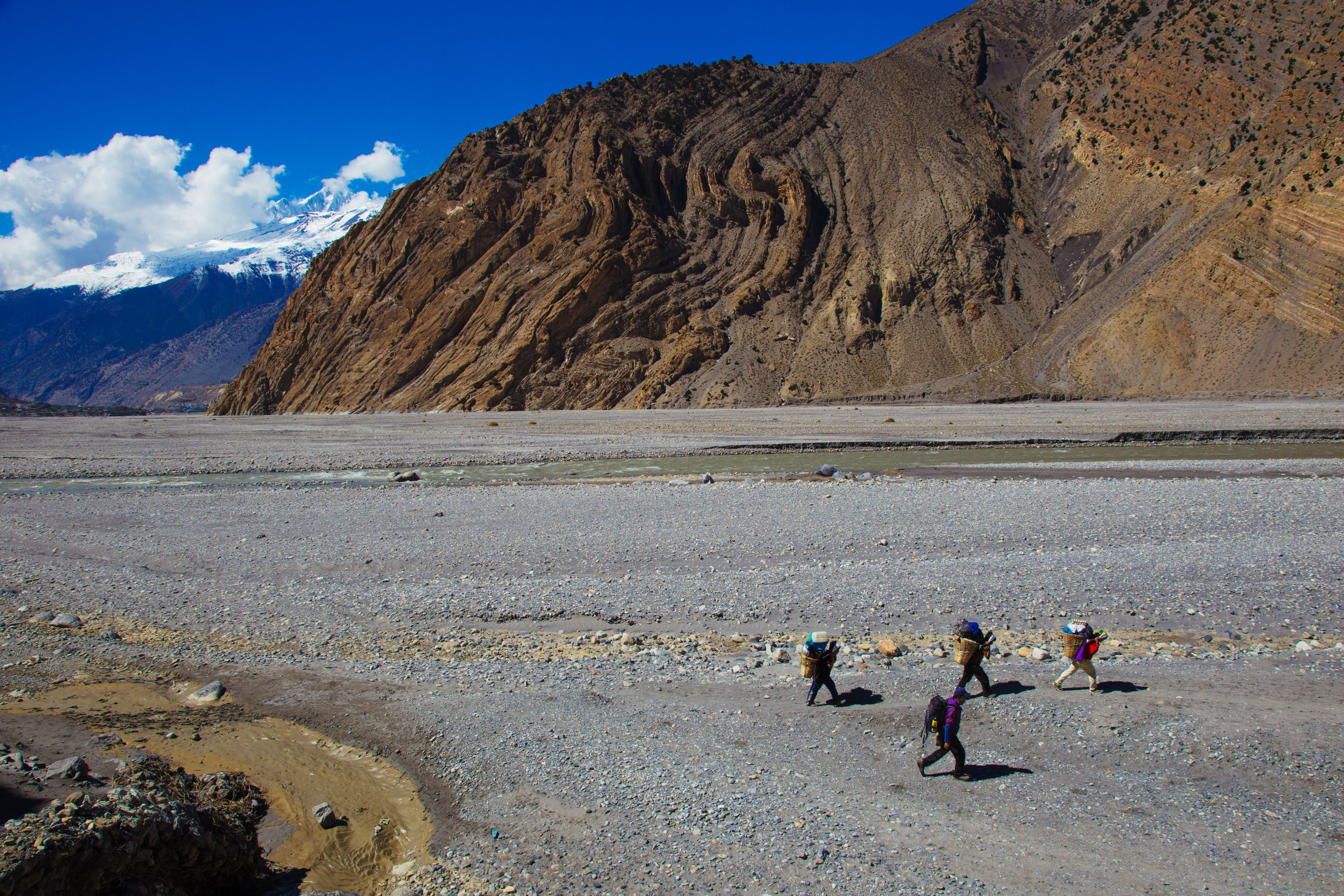
Folded layers of Himalayan rock, exposed in a cliff about 3 kilometres (1.9 mi) northeast of Jomsom, in the Kali Gandaki Gorge in Nepal

Tectonics, the recurring physical changes that affect the arrangement of the Earth's crust, and plate tectonics, the movement of large regions of the Earth's crust in the manner of planar rigid bodies, are key to understanding the formation of the Himalayas. The Earth's crust rests directly on its mantle. Tectonic plates, comprising the crust and the upper portions of their underlying mantle, are moved around by convection in the asthenosphere. The oceanic crust, found beneath oceans, is, on average, seven kilometres (4.3 mi) thick. It is created from upwelling magma at mid-ocean ridges and predominantly consists of basalt, the principal igneous rock on Earth. In contrast, the continental crust underlying dry land has an average thickness of 35 km (22 mi) and is rich in silica, which is less dense than basalt. It makes the continental tectonic plates more buoyant than the oceanic.

India's defining geologic processes, which began 70 million years ago, had involved India rifting, or splitting away, from Gondwana, and the Indian continental plate along with the Neo-Tethys oceanic plate above it jointly moving northward. As these eventually reached the Eurasian plate, the less buoyant oceanic plate subducted, or slid under Eurasia and was carried into the deeper asthenosphere. In contrast, the Indian continental plate was obstructed because of its thickness and buoyancy. The lateral compression generated by the obstruction caused the plate to be sheared horizontally. Its lower crust and mantle slid under, but one layer of the upper crust piled up in sheets (called nappes) ahead of the subduction zone. Geophysicist Peter Molnar noted that most of the Himalayas are "slices of rock that once were the top part of India's crust." This is the process of mountain building, or orogeny, in the Himalayas.

Before the orogeny, the Eurasian coastline had been similar to today's Central Andes. Along such coastlines, the adjoining oceanic plate subducts and erupts as volcanoes. Magma, which eventually crystallizes into granite, rises into the Earth's crust below the active volcanoes but not to the surface. When India's continental plate pushed against Eurasia, not only did a part of the upper crust fold in nappes, but another stiffer part began to push against (or drag) Eurasia's ancient volcanic mountains farther north. As a result, the crust of this formerly coastal region shortened under compression and thickened to become what is today the Tibetan Plateau. Isostatic equilibrium, or the balance between the gravitational force pulling down on the crust and the force of buoyancy pushing up from the mantle, gives the Tibetan Plateau its notable thickness and altitude.

The Indian plate was not the only landmass that had rifted from Gondwana and drifted northward toward Eurasia. Before the India-Eurasia collision in Middle Paleocene (60 Mya) and subsequent Himalayan orogeny, two other landmasses, the Qiangtang terrane and Lhasa terrane, (Note: Terrane: "A far traveled crustal block accreted to a continent. Due to its remote origin, the terrane shows a different geological evolution compared to adjacent parts of the continent.") had drifted up from Gondwana. Qiangtang, a geological region in what is today northern Tibet, had done so in Late Triassic (237–201 Mya). The Lhasa terrane collided with the southern boundary of the Qiangtang in the Early Cretaceous (145–100 Mya). The collision caused the lithospheric mantle of the Lhasa terrane to thicken and shorten, forming a barrier that later prevented the Indian lithosphere from fully subducting under Tibet and leading to further thickening of the Tibetan plateau. The suture zones, or remains of the subduction zone and the terranes that are joined, are found in the Tibetan plateau. The Qiantang and Lhasa terranes were part of the string of microcontinents Cimmeria, today constituting parts of Turkey, Iran, Pakistan, China, Myanmar, Thailand and Malaysia, which had rifted from Gondwana earlier, closing the Paleo-Tethys Ocean above them and opening the Neo-Tethys Ocean between them and Gondwana, eventually colliding with Eurasia, and creating the Cimmerian Orogeny.

After the Lhasa terrane had adjoined Eurasia, an active continental margin opened along its southern flank, below which the Neo-Tethys oceanic plate had begun to subduct. Magmatic activity along this flank produced the Gangdese batholith in what is today the Tibetan trans-Himalaya. Another subduction zone opened to the west, in the ocean basin above the Kohistan-Ladakh island arc. This island arc—formed by one oceanic plate subducting beneath another, its magma rising and creating continental crust—drifted north, closed its ocean basin and collided with Eurasia.

The collision of India with Eurasia closed the Neo-Tethys Ocean. The suture zone (in this instance, the remnants of the Neo-Tethys subduction zone pinched between the two continental crusts), which marks India's welding to Eurasia, is called the Indus-Yarlung suture zone. It lies north of the Himalayas. The headwaters of the Indus River and the Yarlung Tsangpo (later in its course, the Brahmaputra) flow along this suture zone. These two Eurasian rivers, whose courses were continually diverted by the rising Himalayas, define the western and eastern limits, respectively, of the Himalayan mountain range.

During the India-Eurasia collision, two elongated protrusions located on either side of the northern border of the Indian continent generated areas of extreme deformation. A point where mountain ranges with different directions of extension, and thus formed by tectonic forces at varying angles, converge is called a syntaxis (Greek: convergence). The two syntaxes, Nanga Parbat and Namche Barwa, on the northwestern and northeastern corners of the Indian continent, respectively, are characterized by the quick upward movement of land or rocks that were once deeply buried and significantly altered by extreme heat and pressure. Geologists have estimated the rate of uplift of these rocks to be 7 millimetres (0.28 in) per year, or 7 kilometres (4.3 mi) per million years. The protruding regions have some of the highest mountain peaks at 8,125 metres (26,657 ft) and 7,756 metres (25,446 ft), respectively. The regions also have the greatest topographical relief in the interior of a continent, approximately 7,000 metres (23,000 ft) over a horizontal distance of 20–30 kilometres (12–19 mi). Nanga Parbat has a narrow, anticline, or arch-shaped fold whose crest dips sharply to the north, perpendicular to the general direction along which the Himalayas extend. The Indus and Yarlung Tsangpo, which originally emptied into the New-Tethys, now bend around the Nanga Parbat and Namche Barwa, respectively, to eventually empty into the Indian Ocean.

Geologists Wolfgang Frisch, Martin Meschede, and Ronand Blakey write, "India rapidly marched northward towards Asia with a velocity of ca. 20 cm/yr, a plate velocity that exceeds any modern example. This velocity considerably slowed to ca. 5 cm/yr following the collision, yet India continued to protrude into Asia for more than 2000 km. ... The irregular northern margin of the Indian continental crust first came into contact with Eurasia along its northwestern corner, approximately 55 Ma. As a consequence, India underwent a counter-clockwise rotation to close the remaining part of the Neotethys in scissor-like fashion from west to east. The closure of the Neotethys was completed approximately 40 Ma."

Today, the Indian plate continues to be driven horizontally at the Tibetan Plateau, which forces the plateau to continue to move upwards. The Indian plate is moving at 67 mm (2.6 in) per year, and over the next 10 million years, it will travel 1,500 km (930 mi) into Asia. Approximately 20 mm per year of the India–Asia convergence is absorbed by thrusting along the Himalaya southern front. This leads to the Himalayas rising by about 5 mm annually, making them geologically active. The movement of the Indian plate into the Asian plate also makes this region seismically active, leading to earthquakes from time to time.

The Himalayan mountain range consists of three sub-ranges: (1) the Higher- or "Tethys" Himalayas, (2) the Lesser Himalayas, and (3) the Siwaliks. The nappes—large, stacked sheets of rock—found in the Tethys Himalayan mountain range, are primarily composed of sedimentary rocks, such as limestone formed from the accumulation and compression of sediments like sand, mud, and shells deposited in the Neo-Tethys seabed during the Paleogene" (66 Mya–23 Mya). Below the sedimentary rocks in the Higher and Lesser Himalayas is a bottom layer, or basement, composed of metamorphic rock formed much earlier during the Pan-African-Cadomian orogeny between 650 Mya and 550 Mya. The lowest subrange, the Siwaliks, represents the sedimentary rock deposits washed off the rising Himalayas in a foreland basin, a low-lying crustal region, at their foot. It primarily consists of sandstones, shales, and conglomerates formed during the Neogene period (23 Mya to 2.6 Mya).

Geologists Wolfgang Frisch, Martin Meschede, and Ronand Blakey further write, "The Siwaliks are both underlain and overlain by thrusts; they have been overridden by the nappe stack of the Higher and Lesser Himalayas and, in turn, are thrust over more interior parts of the Indian continent. Each of the three mega-units is internally imbricated into several individual nappes. Fensters (windows) and klippen provide important structural information regarding the thrust belts and help document the existence of broad thrust sheets, some of which record thrust distances in excess of 100 km. A fenster or window is an erosional hole through a thrust sheet that exposes a tectonically lower unit framed by a higher unit; a klippe is detached by erosion and forms a remnant of a nappe or higher thrust sheet that rests on top of a lower unit."

== Hydrology ==
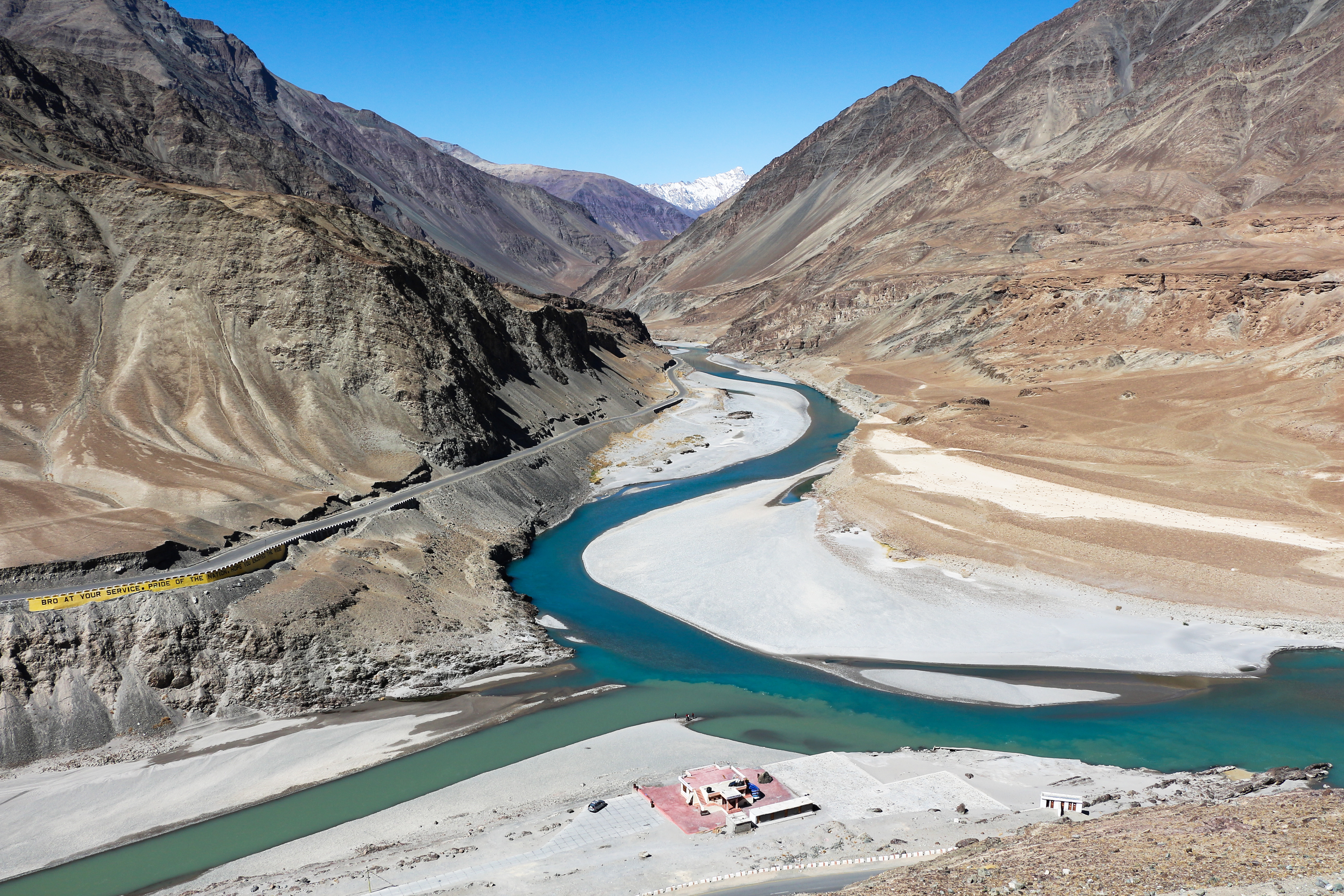
Confluence of the Indus and Zanskar rivers in Ladakh

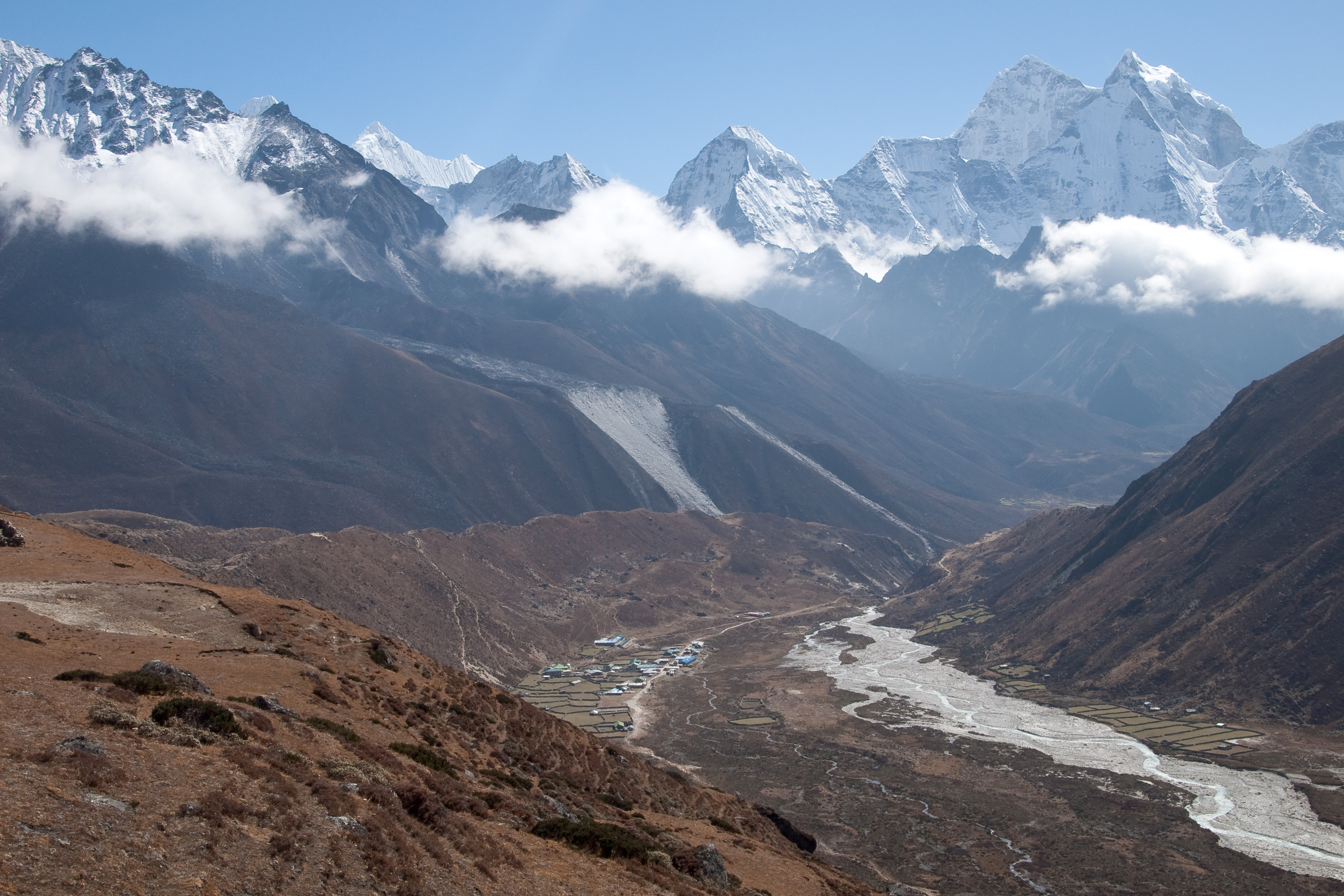
Imja Khola river valley in Solukhumbu, Nepal

Despite their scale, the Himalayas do not form a major continental divide, and a number of rivers cut through the range, particularly in the eastern part of the range. As a result, the main ridge of the Himalayas is not clearly defined, and mountain passes are not as significant for traversing the range as with other mountain ranges. Himalayas' rivers drain into two large systems:

- The western rivers combine into the Indus Basin. The Indus itself forms the northern and western boundaries of the Himalayas. It begins in Tibet, at the confluence of Sengge and Gar rivers, and flows north-west through India into Pakistan before turning south-west to the Arabian Sea. It is fed by several major tributaries draining the southern slopes of the Himalayas, including the Jhelum, Chenab, Ravi, Beas, and Sutlej rivers, the five rivers of the Punjab.
- The other Himalayan rivers drain the Ganges-Brahmaputra Basin. Its main rivers are the Ganges, the Brahmaputra, and the Yamuna, as well as other tributaries. The Brahmaputra originates as the Yarlung Tsangpo River in western Tibet, and flows east through Tibet and west through the plains of Assam. The Ganges and the Brahmaputra meet in Bangladesh and drain into the Bay of Bengal through the world's largest river delta, the Sunderbans.

The northern slopes of Gyala Peri and the peaks beyond the Tsangpo, sometimes included in the Himalayas, drain into the Irrawaddy River, which originates in eastern Tibet and flows south through Myanmar to drain into the Andaman Sea. The Salween, Mekong, Yangtze, and Yellow River all originate from parts of the Tibetan Plateau that are geologically distinct from the Himalaya mountains and are therefore not considered true Himalayan rivers. Some geologists refer to all the rivers collectively as the circum-Himalayan rivers.

=== Glaciers ===
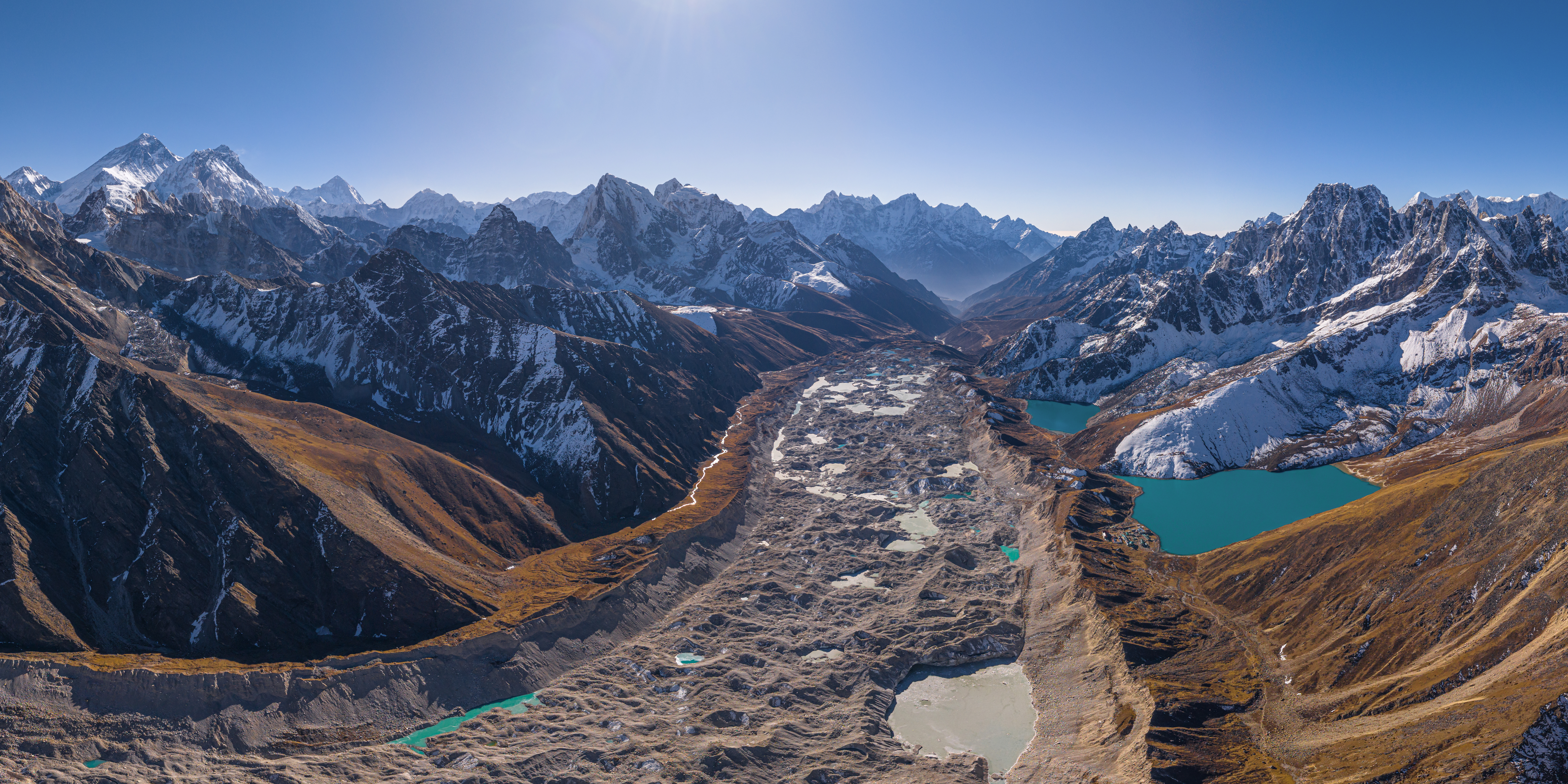
Aerial view of the southern end of the Ngozumpa glacier in the Sagarmatha National Park of Nepal, showing the Gokyo village and lakes on the right, and Everest, Lhotse and Makalu, three of the world's five highest peaks, on the left; view south from Cho Oyo towards the Dudh Kosi valley.

The great ranges of central Asia, including the Himalayas, contain the third-largest deposit of ice and snow in the world, after Antarctica and the Arctic. Some even refer to this region as the "Third Pole". The Himalayan range encompasses about 15,000 glaciers, which store about 12,000 cubic kilometres (2,900 cubic miles), or 3600–4400 Gt (10^{12} kg) of fresh water. Its glaciers include the Gangotri and Yamunotri (Uttarakhand) and Khumbu glaciers (Mount Everest region), Langtang glacier (Langtang region), and Zemu (Sikkim).

Owing to the mountains' latitude near the Tropic of Cancer, the permanent snow line is among the highest in the world, at typically around 5,500 m (18,000 ft). In contrast, equatorial mountains in New Guinea, the Rwenzoris, and Colombia have a snow line some 900 m (2,950 ft) lower. The higher regions of the Himalayas are snowbound throughout the year, in spite of their proximity to the tropics, and they form the sources of several large perennial rivers.

In recent years, scientists have monitored a notable increase in the rate of glacier retreat across the region as a result of climate change. For example, glacial lakes have been forming rapidly on the surface of debris-covered glaciers in the Bhutan Himalaya during the last few decades. Studies have measured an approximately 13% overall decrease in glacial coverage in the Himalayas over the last 40–50 years. Local conditions play a large role in glacial retreat, however, and glacial loss can vary locally from a few m/yr to 61 m/yr. A marked acceleration in glacial mass loss has also been observed since 1975, from about 5–13 Gt/yr to 16–24 Gt/yr. Although the effect of this will not be known for many years, it potentially could mean disaster for the hundreds of millions of people who rely on the glaciers to feed the rivers during the dry seasons. The global climate change will affect the water resources and livelihoods of the Greater Himalayan region. The vulnerability of Himalayan water resources is an active area of research, with these mountain regions described as "water towers" for downstream populations.

=== Lakes ===
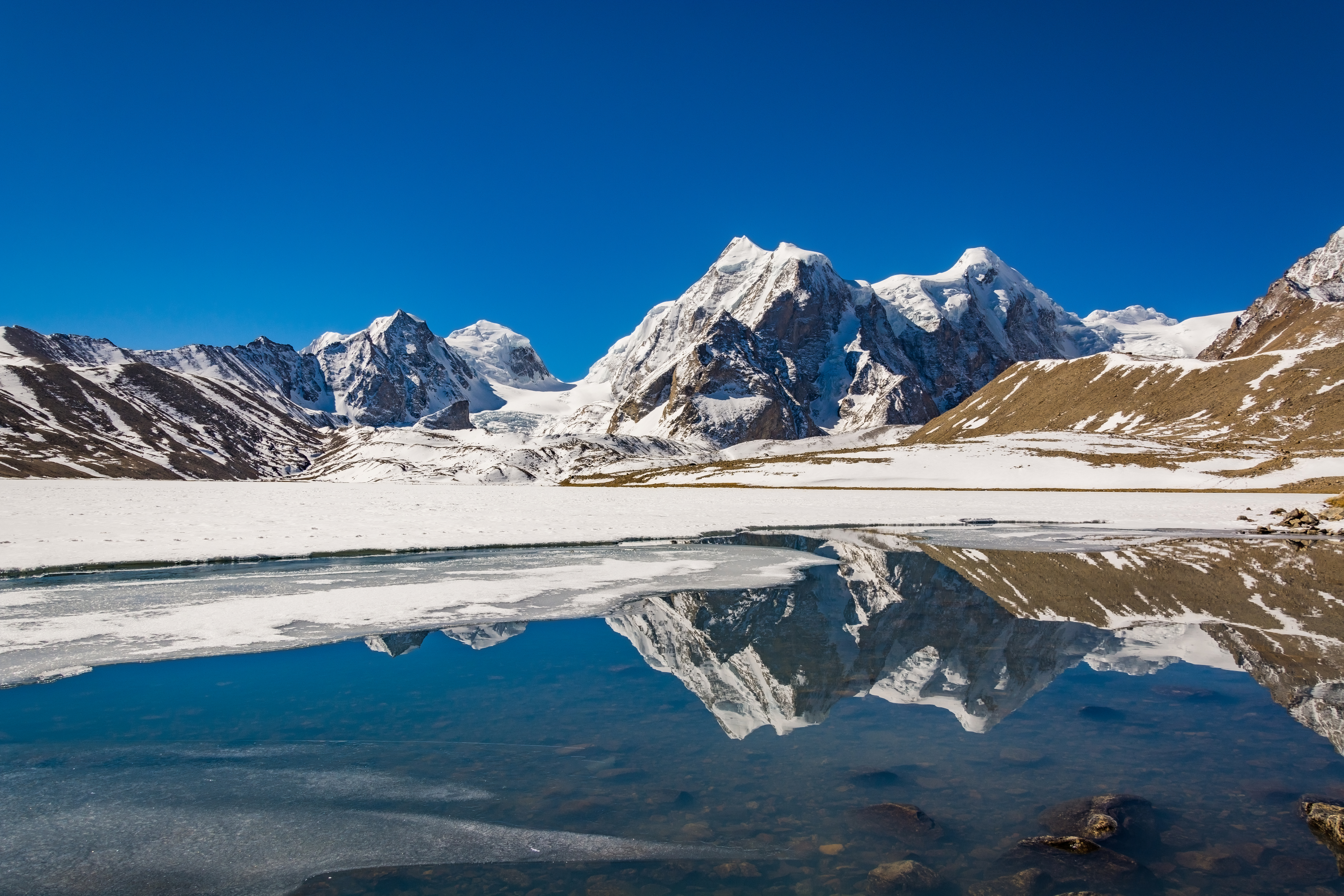
Gurudongmar Lake in Sikkim, India

The Himalayan region is dotted with hundreds of lakes. Pangong Tso, which is spread across the border between India and China, at the far western end of Tibet, is among the largest with a surface area of 700 km^{2} (270 sq mi).

South of the main range, the lakes are smaller. Tilicho Lake in Nepal, in the Annapurna massif, is one of the highest lakes in the world. Other lakes include Rara Lake in western Nepal, She-Phoksundo Lake in the Shey Phoksundo National Park of Nepal, Gurudongmar Lake, in North Sikkim, Gokyo Lakes in Solukhumbu district of Nepal, and Lake Tsongmo, near the Indo-China border in Sikkim.

Some of the lakes present the danger of a glacial lake outburst flood. The Tsho Rolpa glacier lake in the Rowaling Valley, in the Dolakha District of Nepal, is rated as the most dangerous. The lake, which is located at an altitude of 4,580 m (15,030 ft), has grown considerably over the last 50 years due to glacial melting. The mountain lakes are known to geographers as tarns if they are caused by glacial activity. Tarns are found mostly in the upper reaches of the Himalaya, above 5,500 m (18,000 ft).

Temperate Himalayan wetlands provide important habitat and layover sites for migratory birds. Many mid and low altitude lakes remain poorly studied in terms of their hydrology and biodiversity, like Khecheopalri in the Sikkim Eastern Himalayas.

== Climate ==
=== Temperature ===
The physical factors determining the climate in any location in the Himalayas include latitude, altitude, and the relative motion of the Southwest monsoon. From north to south, the mountains cover more than eight degrees of latitude, spanning temperate to subtropical zones. The colder air of Central Asia is prevented from blowing down into South Asia by the physical configuration of the Himalayas. This causes the tropical zone to extend farther north in South Asia than anywhere else in the world. The evidence is unmistakable in the Brahmaputra valley as the warm air from the Bay of Bengal bottlenecks and rushes up past Namcha Barwa, the eastern anchor of the Himalayas, and into southeastern Tibet. Temperatures in the Himalayas cool by 2.0 degrees C (3.6 degrees F) for every 300 metres (980 ft) increase of altitude.

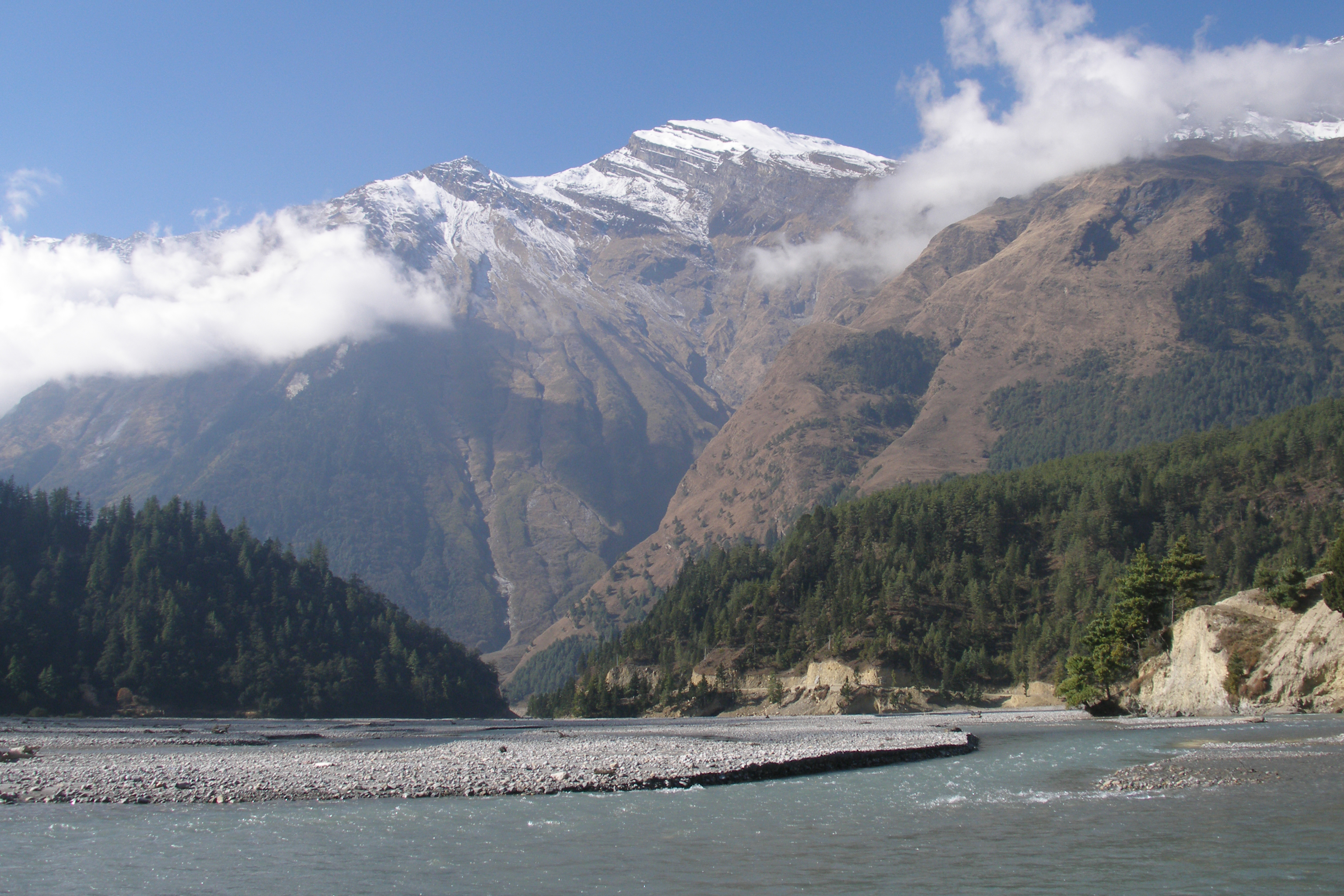
Gandaki River in Nepal

As the physical features of mountains are irregular, with broken jagged contours, there can be wide variations in temperature over short distances. Temperature at a location on a mountain depends on the season of the year, the bearing of the sun with respect to the face on which the location lies, and the mass of the mountain, i.e. the amount of matter in the mountain. As the temperature is directly proportional to received radiation from the sun, the faces that receive more direct sunlight also have a greater heat buildup. In narrow valleys—lying between steep mountain faces—there can be dramatically different weather along their two margins. The side to the north with a mountain above facing south can have an extra month of the growing season. The mass of the mountain also influences the temperature, as it acts as a heat island, in which more heat is absorbed and retained than the surroundings, and therefore influences the heat budget or the amount of heat needed to raise the temperature from the winter minimum to the summer maximum.

The immense scale of the Himalayas means that many summits can create their own weather, the temperature fluctuating from one summit to another, from one face to another, and all may be quite different from the weather in nearby plateaus or valleys.

=== Precipitation ===
The Himalayan hydroclimate is crucial for South Asia, where annual summer monsoon floods impact millions.

A critical influence on the Himalayan climate is the Southwest Monsoon. Variability in monsoon rainfall, influenced by local Hadley circulation and tropical sea surface temperatures, is the main factor behind wet and dry years. This is not so much the rain of the summer months as the wind that carries the rain. Different rates of heating and cooling between the Central Asian continent and the Indian Ocean create large differences in the atmospheric pressure prevailing above each. In the winter, a high-pressure system forms and remains suspended above Central Asia, forcing air to flow in the southerly direction over the Himalayas. But in Central Asia, as there is no substantial source for water to be diffused as vapour, the winter winds blowing across South Asia are dry. In the summer months, the Central Asian plateau heats up more than the ocean waters to its south. As a result, the air above it rises higher and higher, creating a thermal high. Off-shore high-pressure systems in the Indian Ocean push the moist summer air inland toward the low-pressure system. When the moist air meets mountains, it rises and upon subsequent cooling, its moisture condenses and is released as rain, typically heavy rain. The wet summer monsoon winds cause precipitation in India and all along the layered southern slopes of the Himalayas. This forced lifting of air is called the orographic effect.

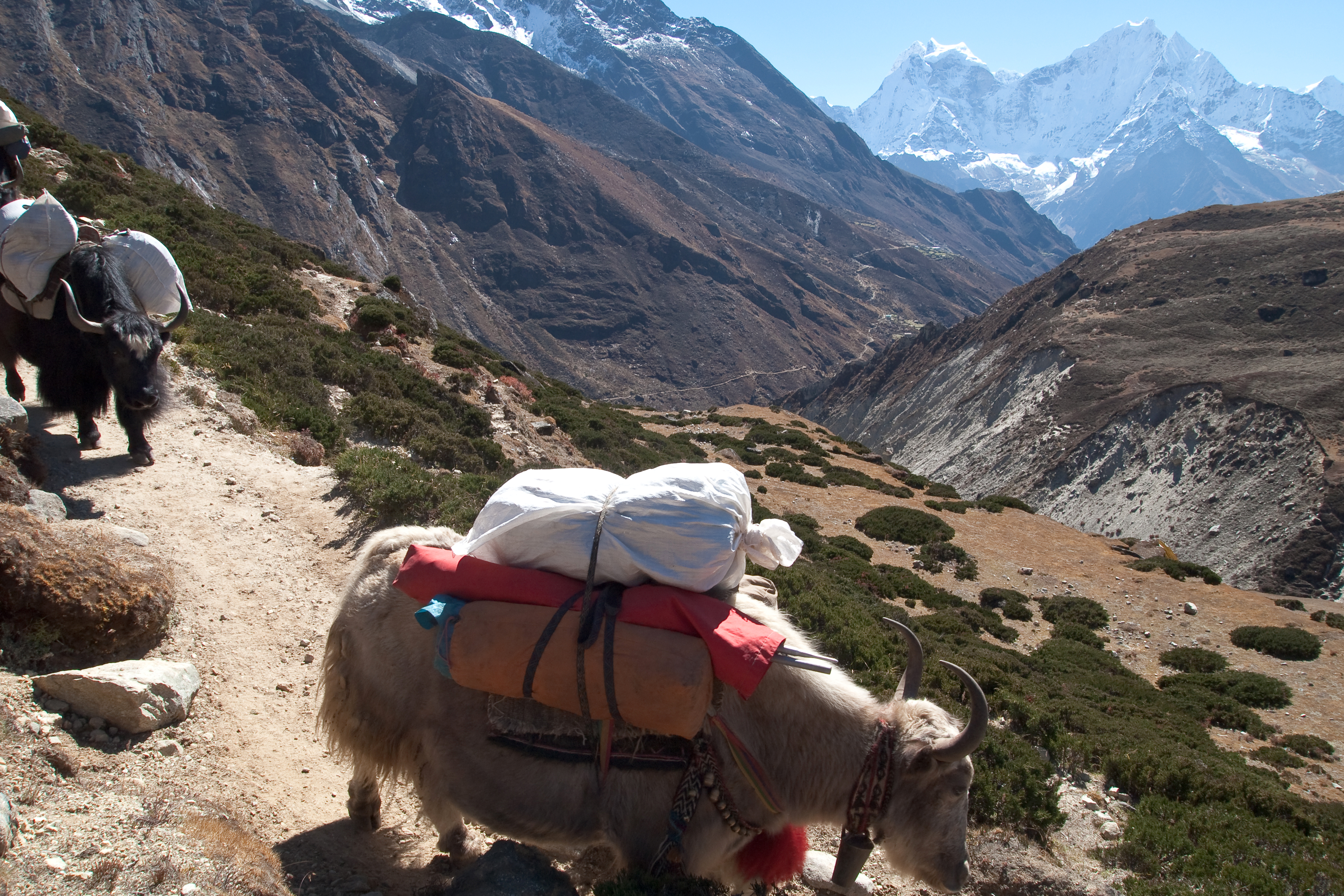
A caravan of yaks in the Himalayas

=== Winds ===
The vast size, huge altitude range, and complex topography of the Himalayas mean they experience a wide range of climates, from humid subtropical in the foothills, to cold and dry desert conditions on the Tibetan side of the range. For much of the Himalayas—in the areas to the south of the high mountains, the monsoon is the most characteristic feature of the climate and causes most of the precipitation, while the western disturbance brings winter precipitation, especially in the west. Heavy rain arrives on the southwest monsoon in June and persists until September. The monsoon can seriously impact transport and cause major landslides. It restricts tourism – the trekking and mountaineering season is limited to either before the monsoon in April/May or after the monsoon in October/November (autumn). In Nepal and Sikkim, there are often considered to be five seasons: summer, monsoon, autumn, (or post-monsoon), winter, and spring.

Using the Köppen climate classification, the lower elevations of the Himalayas, reaching in mid-elevations in central Nepal (including the Kathmandu valley), are classified as Cwa, Humid subtropical climate with dry winters. Higher up, most of the Himalayas have a subtropical highland climate (Cwb).

The intensity of the southwest monsoon diminishes as it moves westward along the range, with as much as 2,030 mm (80 in) of rainfall in the monsoon season in Darjeeling in the east, compared to only 975 mm (38.4 in) during the same period in Shimla in the west.

The northern side of the Himalayas, also known as the Tibetan Himalaya, is dry, cold, and generally windswept, particularly in the west where it has a cold desert climate. The vegetation is sparse and stunted and the winters are severely cold. Most of the precipitation in the region is in the form of snow during the late winter and spring months.

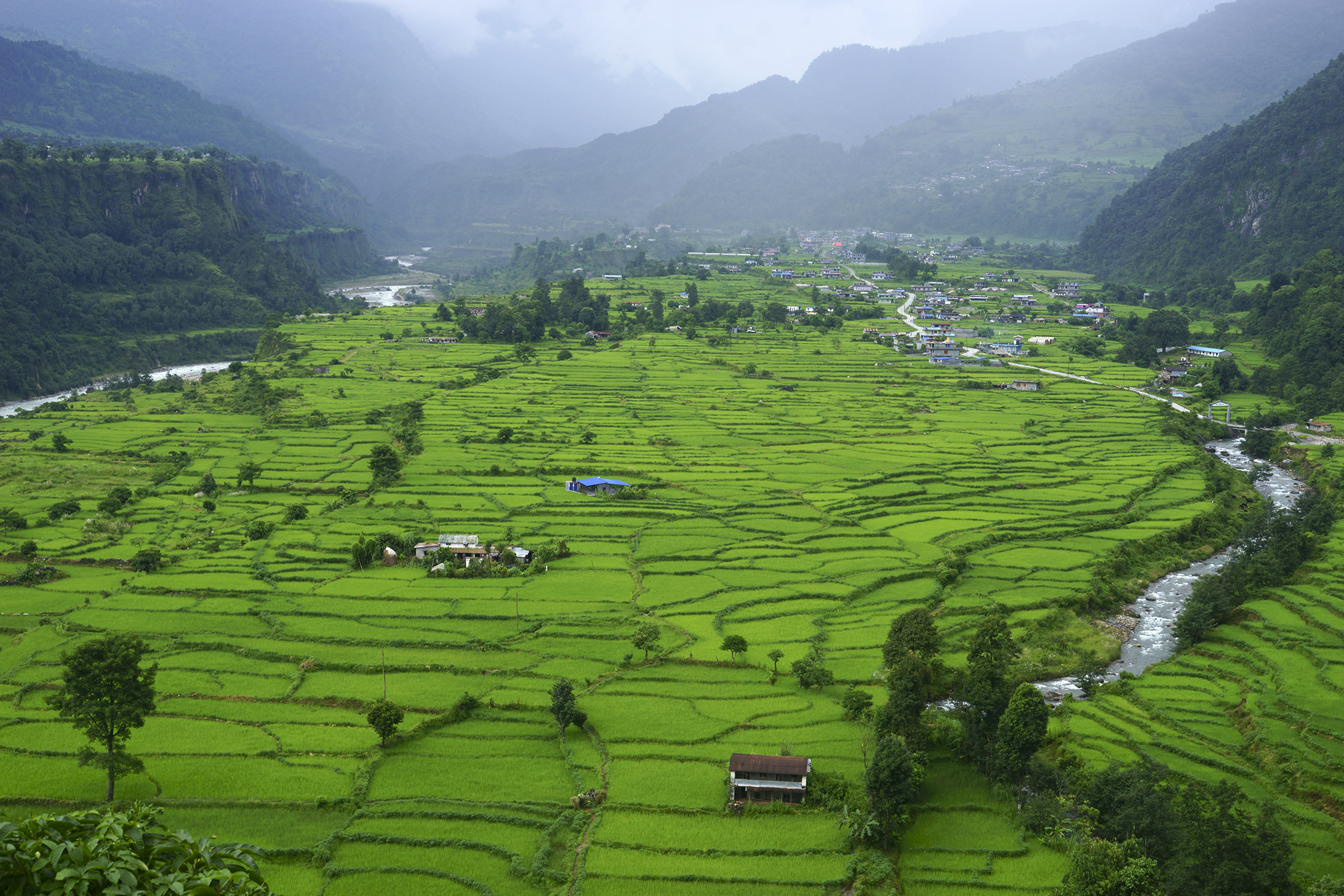
A village in the Pokhara Valley during the monsoon season; the valley lies to the south of the Annapurna massif.

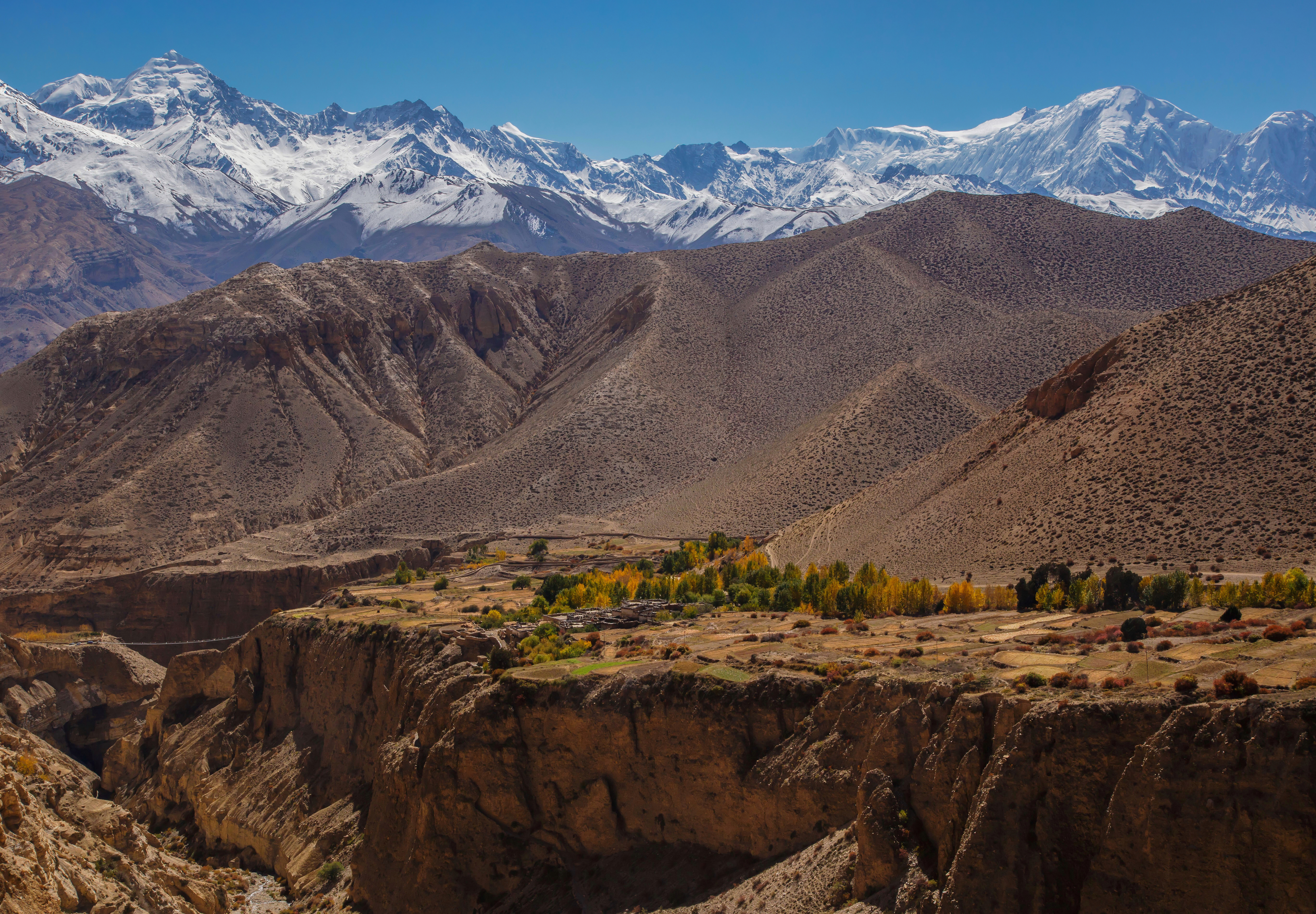
The cold desert region of Upper Mustang; the region lies to the north of the Annapurna massif (visible in the background).

Local impacts on climate are significant throughout the Himalayas. Temperatures fall by 0.2 to 1.2 °C for every 100 m (330 ft) rise in altitude. This gives rise to a variety of climates, from a nearly tropical climate in the foothills, to tundra and permanent snow and ice at higher elevations. Local climate is also affected by the topography: The leeward side of the mountains receive less rain while the well-exposed slopes get heavy rainfall and the rain shadow of large mountains can be significant, for example, leading to near desert conditions in the Upper Mustang, which is sheltered from the monsoon rains by the Annapurna and Dhaulagiri massifs and has annual precipitation of around 300 mm (12 in), while Pokhara on the southern side of the massifs has substantial rainfall (3,900 mm or 150 in a year). Thus, although annual precipitation is generally higher in the east than in the west, local variations are often more important.

The Himalayas have a profound effect on the climate of the Indian subcontinent and the Tibetan Plateau. They prevent frigid, dry winds from blowing south into the subcontinent, which keeps South Asia much warmer than corresponding temperate regions in the other continents. It also forms a barrier for the monsoon winds, keeping them from traveling northwards, and causing heavy rainfall in the Terai region. The rain shadowing of Himalayas are also believed to play an important part in the formation of Central Asian deserts, such as the Taklamakan and Gobi.

== Ecology ==
The flora and fauna of the Himalayas vary with climate, rainfall, altitude, and soils. The climate ranges from tropical at the base of the mountains to permanent ice and snow at the highest elevations. The amount of yearly rainfall increases from west to east along the southern front of the range. This diversity of altitude, rainfall, and soil conditions, combined with the very high snow line, supports a variety of distinct plant and animal communities. The extremes of high altitude (low atmospheric pressure), combined with extreme cold, favor extremophile organisms.

At high altitudes, the elusive and previously endangered snow leopard is the main predator. Its prey includes members of the goat family grazing on the alpine pastures and living on the rocky terrain, notably the endemic bharal or Himalayan blue sheep. The Himalayan musk deer is also found at high altitudes. Hunted for its musk, it is now rare and endangered. Other endemic or near-endemic herbivores include the Himalayan tahr, the takin, the Himalayan serow, and the Himalayan goral. The critically endangered Himalayan subspecies of the brown bear is found sporadically across the range, as is the Asian black bear. In the mountainous mixed deciduous and conifer forests of the eastern Himalayas, red pandas feed in the dense understories of bamboo. Lower down, the forests of the foothills are inhabited by several different primates, including the endangered Gee's golden langur and the Kashmir gray langur, with highly restricted ranges in the east and west of the Himalayas, respectively.

The unique floral and faunal wealth of the Himalayas is undergoing structural and compositional changes due to climate change. Hydrangea hirta is an example of floral species that can be found in this area. The increase in temperature is shifting various species to higher elevations. The oak forest is being invaded by pine forests in the Garhwal Himalayan region. There are reports of early flowering and fruiting in some tree species, especially rhododendron, apple, and box myrtle. The highest known tree species in the Himalayas is Juniperus tibetica, located at 4,900 m (16,080 ft) in Southeastern Tibet.

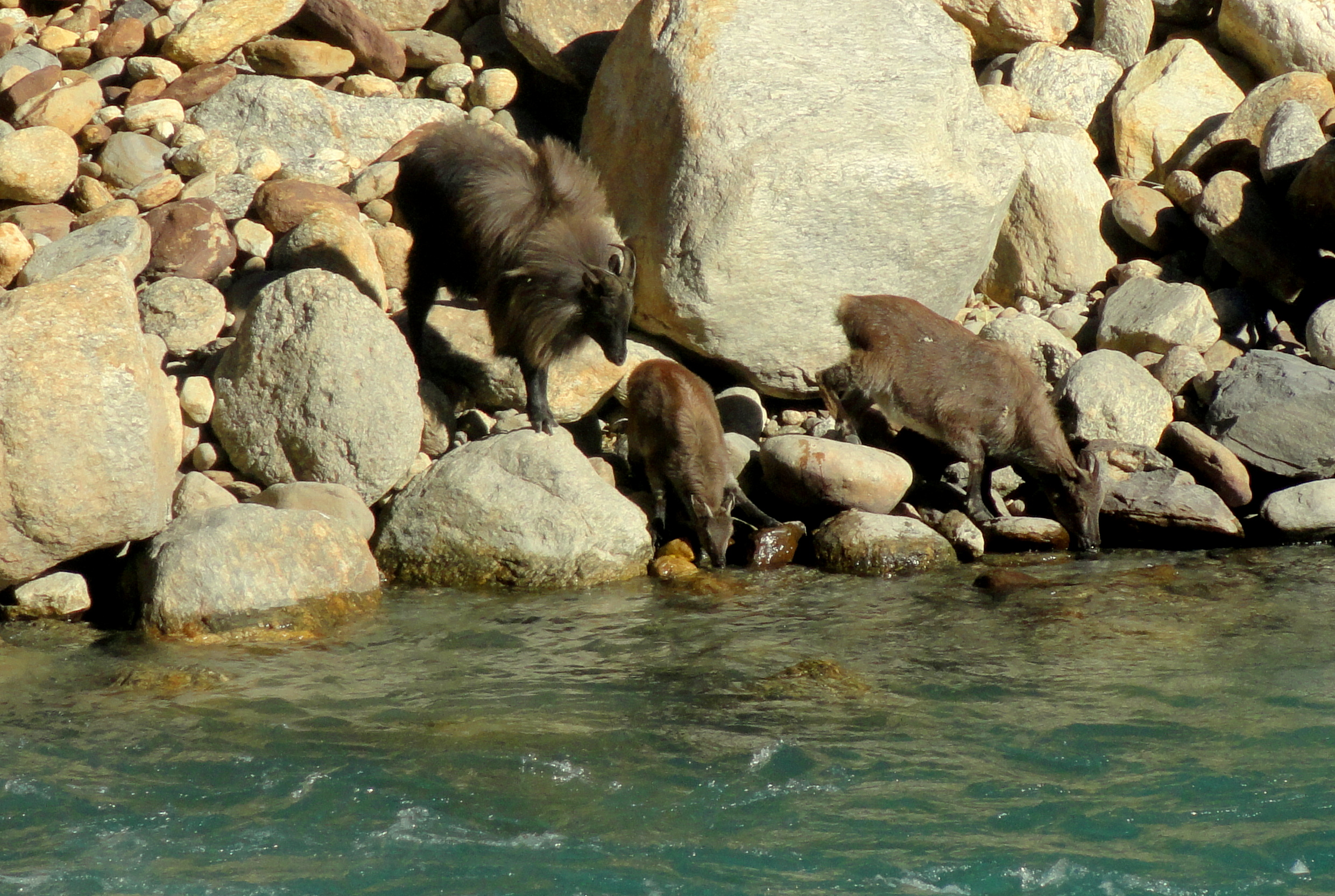
Himalayan tahrs (male, kid and female) drinking from the Bhagirathi River near Uttarkashi, India

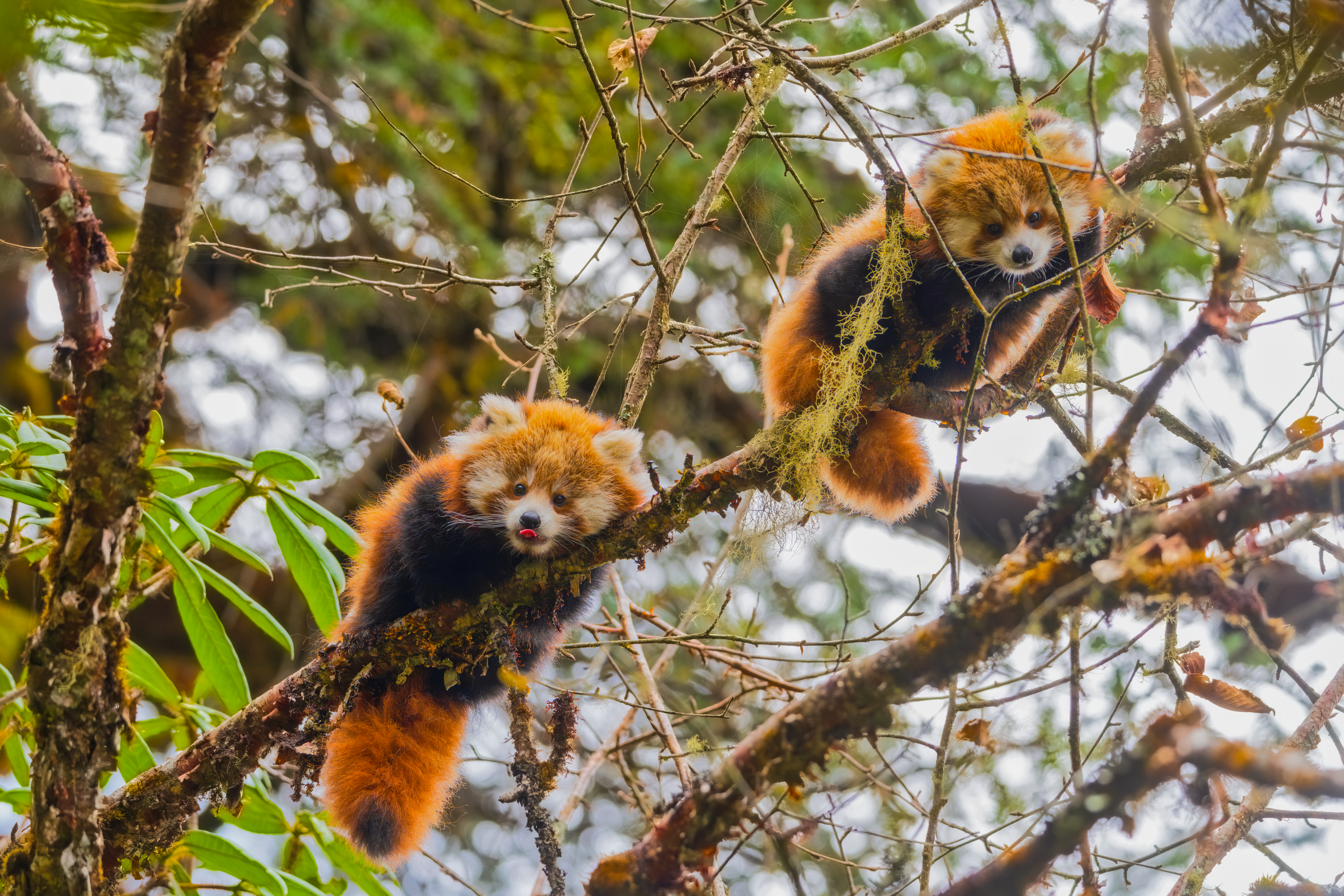
Two red panda cubs perched in a tree at the Langtang National Park in Nepal

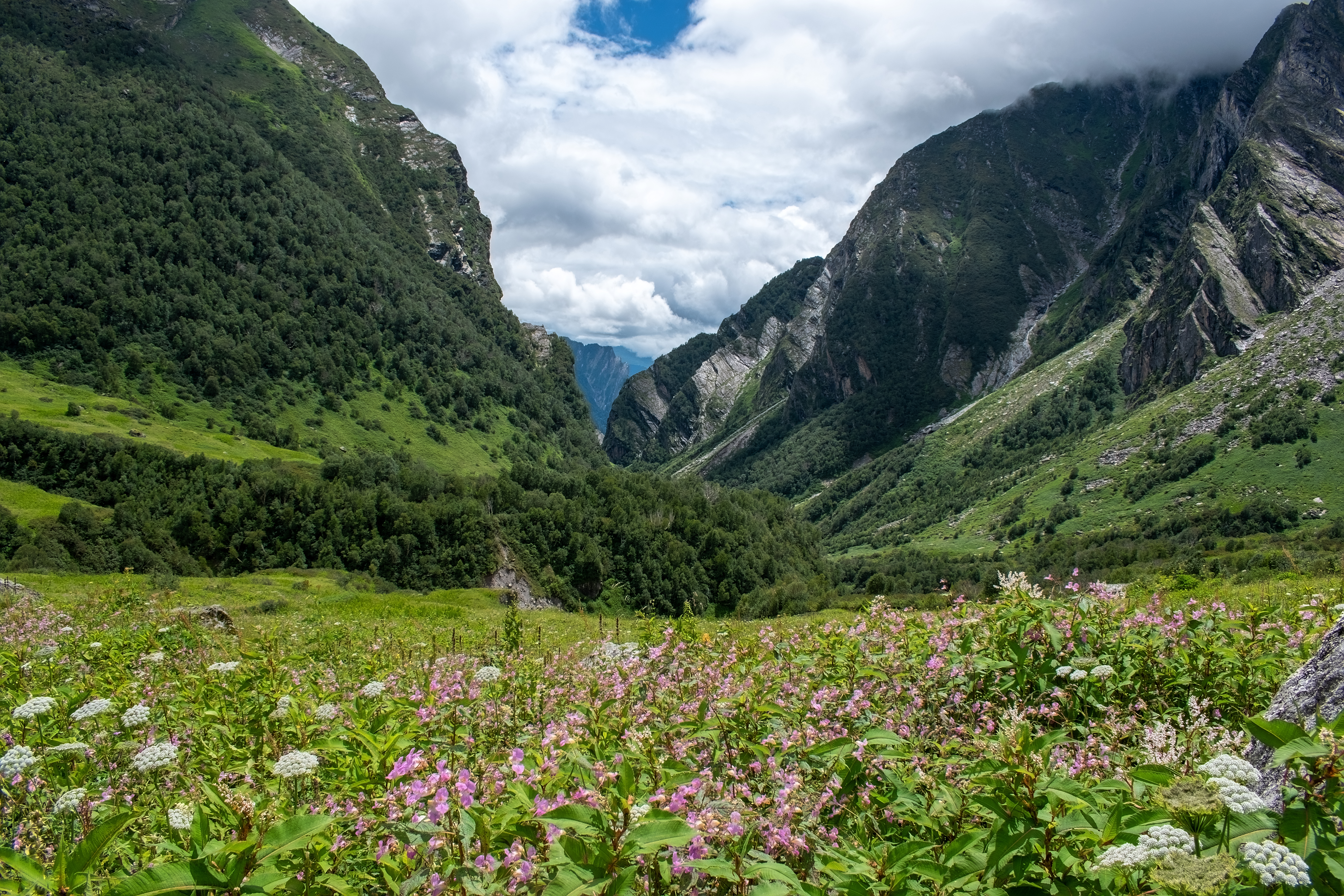
Himalayan flora at the Valley of Flowers National Park in India

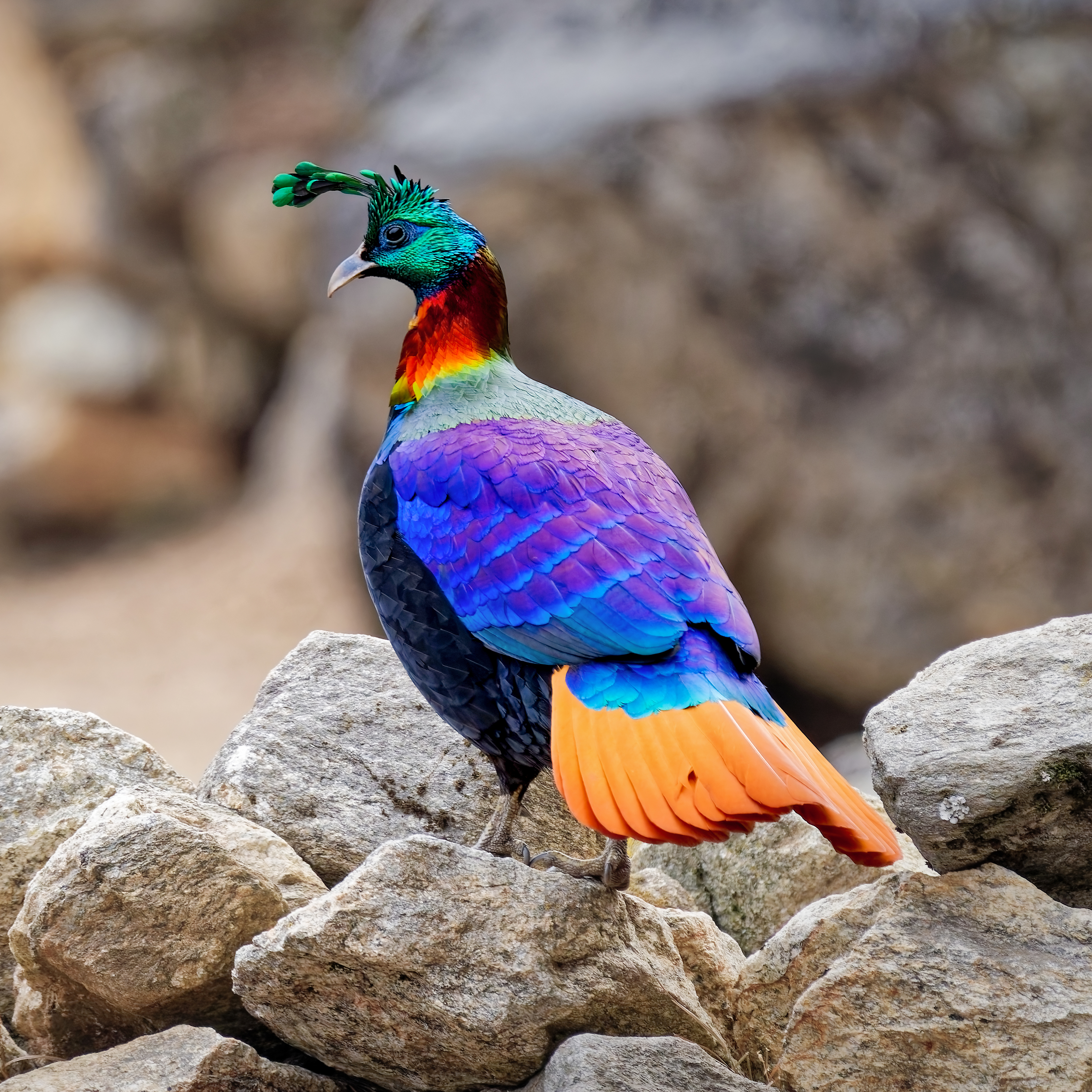
A male Himalayan monal in Sagarmatha National Park, Nepal

A snow leopard duo filmed in the Spiti Valley of Himachal Pradesh, India

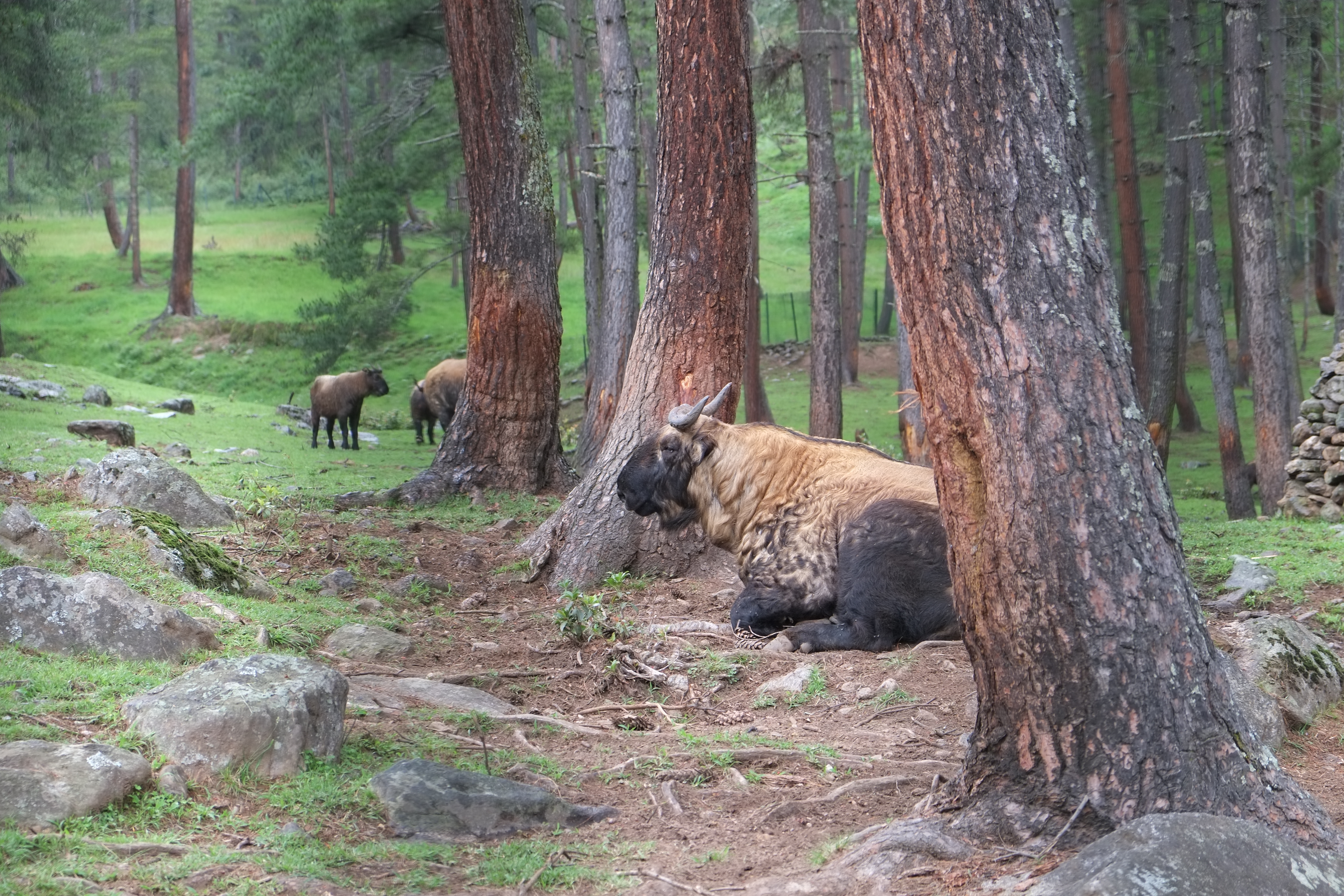
Takins at the Motithang Takin Preserve in Thimphu, Bhutan

== Religions ==
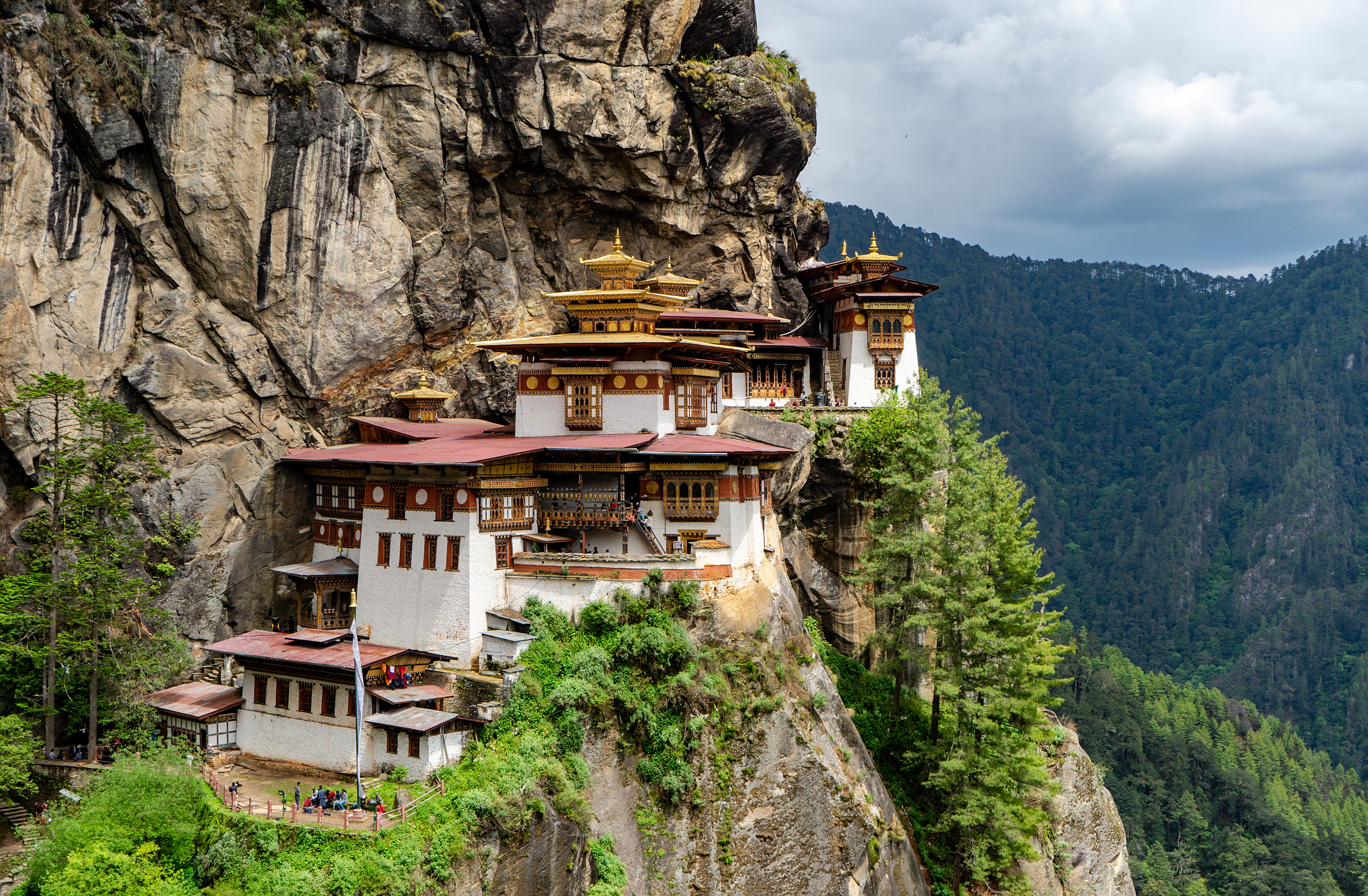
The Taktsang Monastery, in the upper Paro valley of Bhutan, built in the cliffside of a mountain, around a cave where Guru Padmasambhava is believed to have meditated.

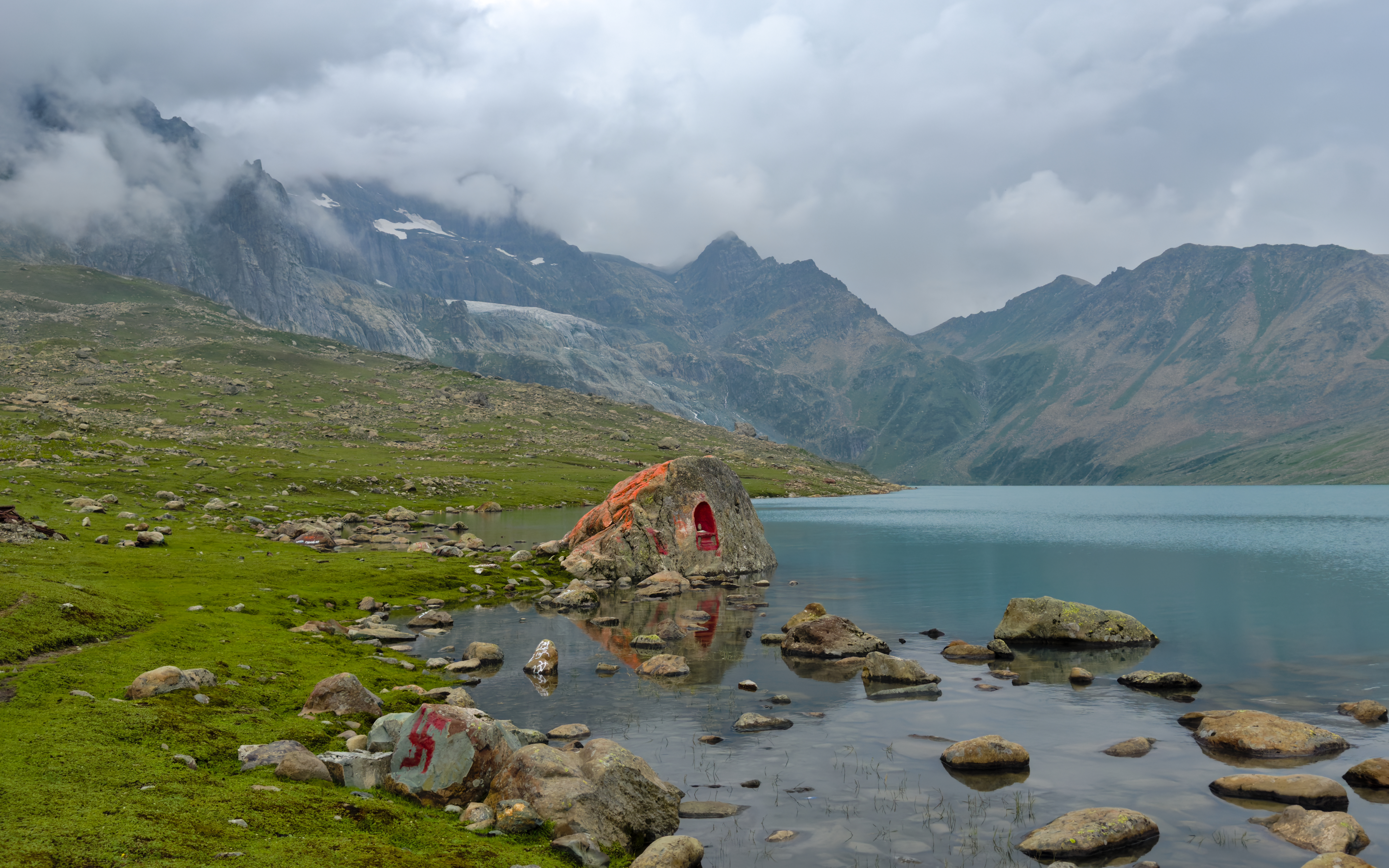
Shiva shrine on the shore of the Gangabal glacial lake situated below Harmukh, a sacred mountain for Hindus located north of the Kashmir Valley.

There are many cultural and mythological aspects associated with the Himalayas. In Jainism, Mount Ashtapada of the Himalayan mountain range is a sacred place where the first Jain tirthankara, Rishabhanatha, attained moksha. It is believed that after Rishabhanatha attained nirvana, his son, Bharata, had constructed three stupas and twenty four shrines of the 24 tirthankaras with their idols studded with precious stones over there and named it Sinhnishdha. For the Hindus, the Himalayas are personified as Himavat, the king of all mountains and the father of the goddess Parvati. The Himalayas are also considered to be the father of the goddess Ganga (the personification of river Ganges). Two of the most sacred places of pilgrimage for the Hindus are the temple complex in Pashupatinath and Muktinath, also known as Shaligrama because of the presence of the sacred black rocks called shaligrams.

The Buddhists also lay a great deal of importance on the Himalayas. Paro Taktsang is the holy place where Buddhism started in Bhutan. The Muktinath is also a place of pilgrimage for the Tibetan Buddhists. They believe that the trees in the poplar grove came from the walking sticks of eighty-four ancient Indian Buddhist magicians or mahasiddhas. They consider the saligrams to be representatives of the Tibetan serpent deity known as Gawo Jagpa. The Himalayan people's diversity shows in many different ways. It shows through their architecture, their languages, and dialects, their beliefs and rituals, as well as their clothing. The shapes and materials of the people's homes reflect their practical needs and beliefs. Another example of the diversity amongst the Himalayan peoples is that handwoven textiles display colors and patterns unique to their ethnic backgrounds. Finally, some people place great importance on jewelry. The Rai and Limbu women wear big gold earrings and nose rings to show their wealth through their jewelry. Several places in the Himalayas are of religious significance in Buddhism, Jainism, Sikhism, Islam and Hinduism. A notable example of a religious site is Paro Taktsang, where Padmasambhava is said to have founded Buddhism in Bhutan.

A number of Vajrayana Buddhist sites are situated in the Himalayas, in Tibet, Bhutan, and in the Indian regions of Ladakh, Sikkim, Arunachal Pradesh, Spiti, and Darjeeling. There were over 6,000 monasteries in Tibet, including the residence of the Dalai Lama. Bhutan, Sikkim, and Ladakh are also dotted with numerous monasteries.

== Resources ==
The Himalayas are home to a diversity of medicinal resources. Plants from the forests have been used for millennia to treat conditions ranging from simple coughs to snake bites. Different parts of the plants – root, flower, stem, leaves, and bark – are used as remedies for different ailments. For example, a bark extract from an Abies pindrow tree is used to treat coughs and bronchitis. Leaf and stem paste from an Andrachne cordifolia is used for wounds and as an antidote for snake bites. The bark of a Callicarpa arborea is used for skin ailments. Nearly a fifth of the gymnosperms, angiosperms, and pteridophytes in the Himalayas are found to have medicinal properties, and more are likely to be discovered.

Most of the population in some Asian and African countries depends on medicinal plants rather than prescriptions and such. Since so many people use medicinal plants as their only source of healing in the Himalayas, the plants are an important source of income. This contributes to economic and modern industrial development both inside and outside the region. The only problem is that locals are rapidly clearing the forests on the Himalayas for wood, often illegally.

== See also ==
- Eastern and Western Himalaya
- Indian Himalayan Region
- List of Himalayan peaks and passes
- List of Himalayan topics
- List of mountains in India, Pakistan, Bhutan, Nepal and China
- List of Ultras of the Himalayas
- Trekking peak

== Sources ==
=== General ===
- Wester, Philippus; Mishra, Arabinda; Mukherji, Aditi; Shrestha, Arun Bhakta, eds. (2019), The Hindu Kush Himalya Assessment: Mountains, Climate Change, Sustainability and People, Springer Open, ICIMOD, HIMAP, ISBN 978-3-319-92287-4, LCCN 2018954855
- Zurick, David; Pacheco, Julsun (2006), Illustrated Atlas of the Himalayas, with Basanta Shrestha and Birendra Bajracharya, Lexington: University Press of Kentucky, ISBN 978-0-8131-2388-2, OCLC 1102237054

=== Geography ===
- Price, Martin F.; Byers, Alton C.; Friend, Donald A.; Kohler, Thomas; Price, Larry W., eds. (2013). Mountain Geography: Physical and Human Dimensions. Berkeley, Los Angeles, and London: University of California Press. ISBN 978-0-520-25431-2. OCLC 841227048.
- Gerrard, John (1990). Mountain environments: an examination of the physical geography of mountains. MIT Press. ISBN 978-0-262-07128-4. OCLC 20637538.

=== Geology ===
- Chakrabarti, B. K. (2016). Geology of the Himalayan Belt: Deformation, Metamorphism, Stratigraphy. Amsterdam and Boston: Elsevier. ISBN 978-0-12-802021-0.
- Davies, Geoffrey F. (2022). Stories from the Deep Earth: How Scientists Figured Out What Drives Tectonic Plates and Mountain Building. Cham, Switzerland: Springer Nature. doi:10.1007/978-3-030-91359-5. ISBN 978-3-030-91358-8. S2CID 245636487.
- Frisch, Wolfgang; Meschede, Martin; Blakey, Ronald (2011). Plate Tectonics: Continental Drift and Mountain Building. Heidelberg: Springer. doi:10.1007/978-3-540-76504-2. ISBN 978-3-540-76503-5.
- Johnson, Michael R. W.; Harley, Simin L. (2012). Orogenesis: The Making of Mountains. Cambridge, UK and New York: Cambridge University Press. ISBN 978-0-521-76556-5.
- Molnar, Peter (2015). Plate Tectonics: A Very Short Introduction. Oxford University Press. ISBN 978-0-19-872826-9.

=== Climate ===
- Clift, Peter D.; Plumb, R. Alan (2008), The Asian Monsoon: Causes, History and Effects, Cambridge and New York: Cambridge University Press, ISBN 978-0-521-84799-5
- Barry, Roger E (2008), Mountain Weather and Climate (3rd ed.), Cambridge and New York: Cambridge University Press, ISBN 978-0-521-86295-0

=== Pilgrimage and Tourism ===
- Bleie, Tone (2003), "Pilgrim Tourism in the Central Himalayas: The Case of Manakamana Temple in Gorkha, Nepal", Mountain Research and Development, 23 (2), International Mountain Society: 177–184, doi:10.1659/0276-4741(2003)023[0177:PTITCH]2.0.CO;2, S2CID 56120507
- Howard, Christopher A (2016), Mobile Lifeworlds: An Ethnography of Tourism and Pilgrimage in the Himalayas, New York: Routledge, doi:10.4324/9781315622026, ISBN 978-0-367-87798-9
- Humbert-Droz, Blaise (2017), "Impacts of Tourism and Military Presence on Wetlands and Their Avifauna in the Himalayas", in Prins, Herbert H. T.; Namgail, Tsewang (eds.), Bird Migration across the Himalayas Wetland Functioning amidst Mountains and Glaciers, Foreword by H.H. The Dali Lama, Cambridge, UK: Cambridge University Press, pp. 343–358, ISBN 978-1-107-11471-5
- Lim, Francis Khek Ghee (2007), "Hotels as sites of power: tourism, status, and politics in Nepal Himalaya", Journal of the Royal Anthropological Institute, New Series, 13 (3), Royal Anthropological Institute: 721–738, doi:10.1111/j.1467-9655.2007.00452.x
- Nyaupane, Gyan P.; Chhetri, Netra (2009), "Vulnerability to Climate Change of Nature-Based Tourism in the Nepalese Himalayas", Tourism Geographies, 11 (1): 95–119, doi:10.1080/14616680802643359, S2CID 55042146
- Nyaupane, Gyan P.; Timothy, Dallen J., eds. (2022), Tourism and Development in the Himalya: Social, Environmental, and Economic Forces, Routledge Cultural Heritage and Tourism Series, London and New York: Routledge, ISBN 978-0-367-46627-5
- Pati, Vishwambhar Prasad (2020), Sustainable Tourism Development in the Himalya: Constraints and Prospects, Environmental Science and Engineering, Cham, Switzerland: Springer Nature, doi:10.1007/978-3-030-58854-0, ISBN 978-3-030-58853-3, S2CID 229256111
- Serenari, Christopher; Leung, Yu-Fai; Attarian, Aram; Franck, Chris (2012), "Understanding environmentally significant behavior among whitewater rafting and trekking guides in the Garhwal Himalaya, India", Journal of Sustainable Tourism, 20 (5): 757–772, Bibcode:2012JSusT..20..757S, doi:10.1080/09669582.2011.638383, S2CID 153859477
