= Syntaxis (geology) =

A syntaxis is an abrupt major change in the dominant orientation of the main fold and thrust structures in an orogenic belt. For example, the Himalayan belt forms a continuous gentle curve in its main part, running almost perpendicular to the motion of the Indian Plate as it collides with the Eurasian Plate. This thrust-dominated plate boundary connects at both ends to the highly oblique, strike-slip dominated boundaries running through Pakistan and Myanmar, forming the Nanga Parbat syntaxis to the west and the Namche Barwa syntaxis in the east.
