= List of Himalayan topics =

The Himalaya are a vast mountain chain in Asia that span multiple countries, including China and India. The Himalaya contain the highest peaks in the world, Mount Everest and K2. These peaks have been attracting mountaineers from around the world since 1920. The Himalaya are also important in art, literature, and religion.

== States and territories ==
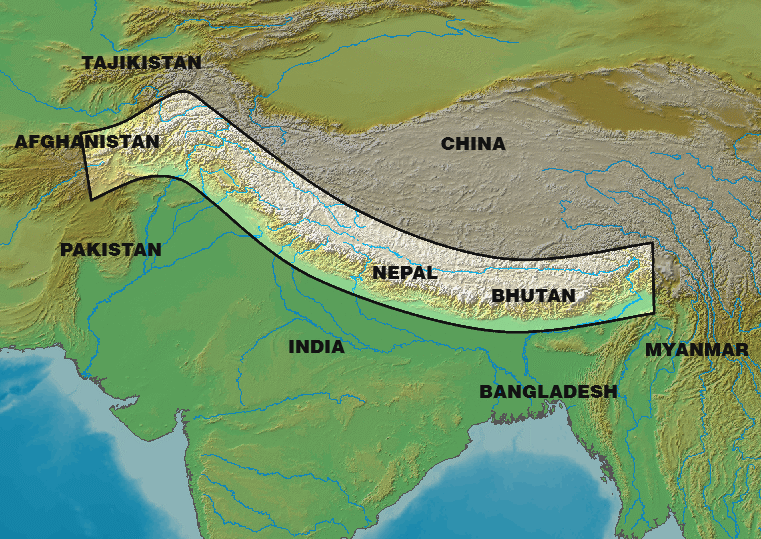
Map of the Himalaya

Geographically, the Himalayan states lie in the Indian subcontinent. The countries and territories include:

- India
  - Jammu and Kashmir
  - Arunachal Pradesh
  - Himachal Pradesh
  - Manipur
  - Meghalaya
  - Mizoram
  - Nagaland
  - Sikkim
  - Tripura
  - Uttarakhand
  - Darjeeling district and Kalimpong district of West Bengal
- Tajikistan
- Afghanistan
- Bhutan
- China

  - Aksai Chin, disputed territory, invaded by China
  - Tibet/South Tibet
  - Trans-Karakoram Tract, disputed territory
- Myanmar
  - Kachin State
- Nepal
- Pakistan
  - Azad Jammu and Kashmir,
  - Gilgit-Baltistan,
  - Afghania, Autonomous provincial region

== Notable peaks ==
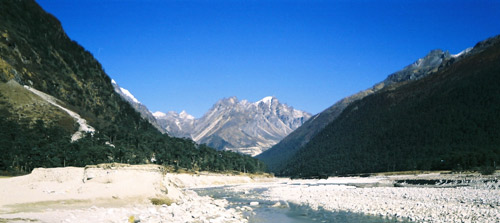
The Himalayan range at Yumesongdong in Sikkim, in the Yumthang River valley

== Notable mountaineers ==
- George Mallory (1886–1924) Attempted first ascent of Mount Everest in 1922 and 1924; died on North Face along with Sandy Irvine.
- Noel Odell (1890–1987) British. First ascent, in 1936, of Nanda Devi, which remained the highest summited peak until 1950. Last person to see Mallory and Irvine high up on Everest in 1924.
- Bill Tilman (1898–1977) British. First ascent of Nanda Devi in 1936. In 1934, first person to penetrate Nanda Devi sanctuary
- Frank Smythe (1900–1949) British. Kamet, and early attempt on Kangchenjunga.
- Eric Shipton (1907–1977) British. With Bill Tilman, first to penetrate Nanda Devi sanctuary. Discovered route to Everest over Khumbu Glacier.
- W. H. Murray Deputy leader to Shipton in 1951. Author of The Scottish Himalayan Expedition (1951)
- John Hunt (1910–1998) British. Leader of 1953 expedition of Mount Everest.
- Tenzing Norgay (1914–1986) Nepalese Sherpa mountaineer. First man on Everest's summit along with Edmund Hillary.
- Maurice Herzog (b. 1919) First person to summit an Eight-thousander, Annapurna, in 1950. Lost all toes and most fingers due to frostbite. Peak not climbed again until 1970.
- Sir Edmund Hillary (1919–2008) New Zealand mountaineer and explorer, the first man on Everest's summit along with Tenzing Norgay.
- Tom Bourdillon (1924–1956) member of British Everest expeditions 1951, 1952, and 1953, reached 300 feet (90 m) from summit of Everest three days before Edmund Hillary and Tenzing Norgay finally conquered it.
- Hermann Buhl (1924–1957) First ascent of Nanga Parbat in 1953 (feat accomplished solo and without oxygen). First ascent of Broad Peak. Died in fall on Chogolisa, body never found.
- Willi Unsoeld (1926–1979) United States. First ascent of Everest from West Face and first major traverse of a Himalayan peak, with Tom Hornbein 1963. Daughter Nanda Devi Unsoeld killed during Nanda Devi expedition 1976. Died during avalanche on Mount Rainier, 1979.
- Chris Bonington (b. 1934) First ascent of Annapurna (South Face), 4 ascents of Everest.
- Nawang Gombu (1935–2011) Indian mountaineer. First person to climb Everest twice: 1963 and 1965.
- Reinhold Messner (born 1944) Italian mountaineer. First man to climb all fourteen mountains over 8000 metres (collectively known as the eight-thousanders).
- Jerzy Kukuczka (1948–1989) Polish mountaineer. Ascended all fourteen eight-thousanders faster than anybody else, establishing ten new routes.
- Erhard Loretan Swiss climber. Ascended all 14 8000ers, most establishing new routes and/or in alpine style.
- Nazir Sabir Pakistani mountaineer. First ascent of two eight thousanders (Broad Peak & Gasherbrum II) in a single attempt.
- Swami Sundaranand (b. 1926 India) Climbed 25 mountains with little or no equipment from 1950–1990 to experience open eyed Samādhi using the ancient techniques of the Himalayan yogis. Noted also for his extensive photography of the Indian Himalayas.
- Casey Mackins An English mountaineer who climbed Mt Everest by a new route without oxygen from Tibet in 1984 and then again from Nepal in 1990 during his famous Sea to Summit expedition where he became the first person to climb Everest starting from sea level
- José Antonio Delgado (1965–2006) was the first Venezuelan mountaineer to reach the summit of five eight-thousanders. He was one of the most experienced climbers in Latin America.
- Ed Viesturs (b. June 22, 1959) is the first American, and 12th person overall, to summit all fourteen eight-thousanders, and the sixth climber to do it without bottled oxygen.
- Lhakpa Gelu (born 1967), a Sherpa who currently holds the world record for the quickest climb to the summit of Mount Everest from base camp. On May 25, 2004, he set the record, with a total time of 10 hours and 56 minutes.
- Apa Sherpa (born c. 1960) On May 11, 2011, successfully summited Mt. Everest for the 21st time, breaking his own record for most successful ascents.
- Edurne Pasaban (born 1973) Basque mountaineer, the first woman to climb all fourteen eight-thousanders.
- Krzysztof Wielicki (born 1950) Polish mountaineer, the fifth man to climb all fourteen eight-thousanders. Three of them (Mount Everest, Kangchenjunga and Lhotse) he ascended as the first man ever to do it in winter.
- Junko Tabei (born 1939) First woman to climb Mount Everest (1975)

== Religions ==
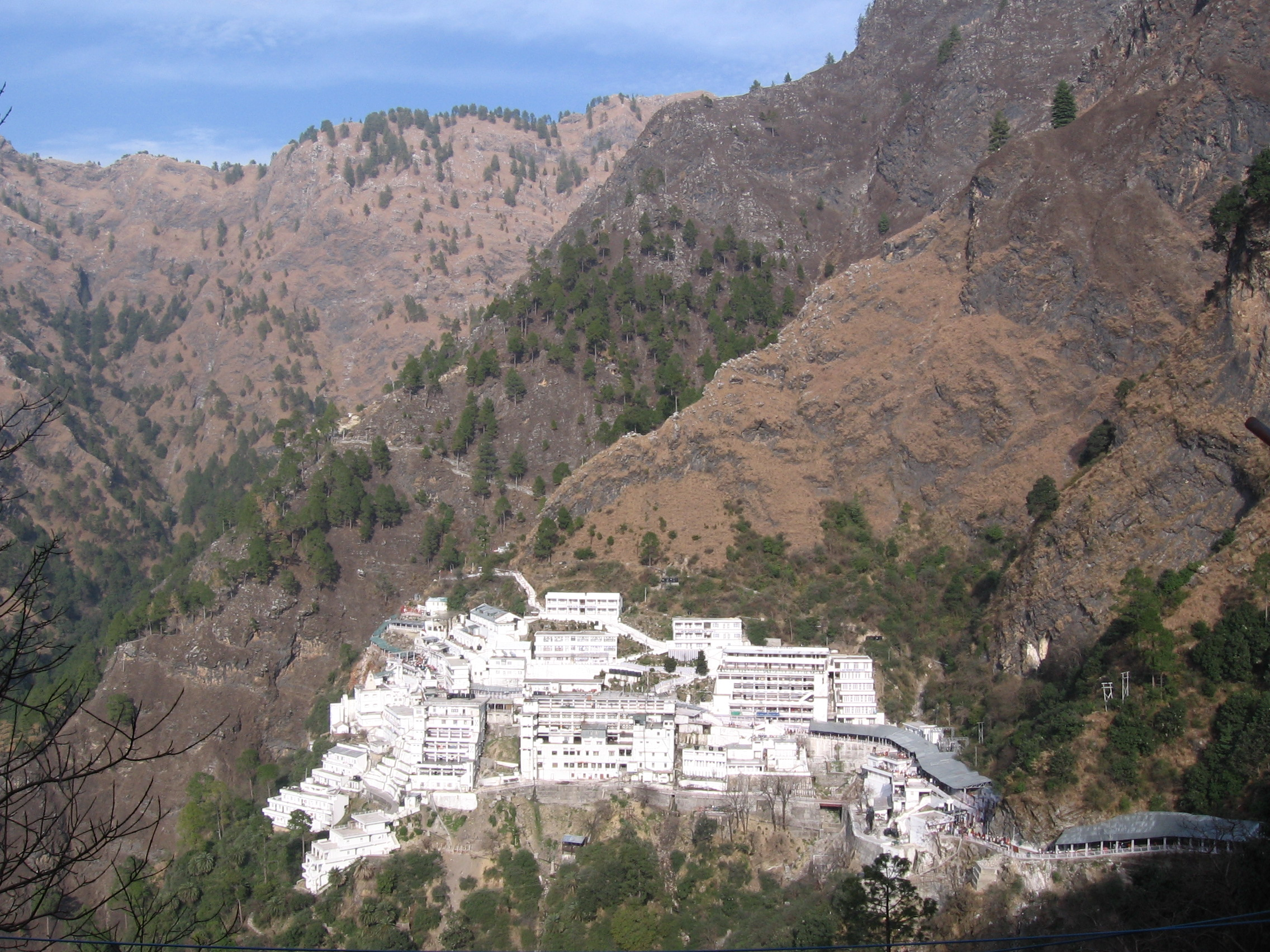
The Vaishno Devi shrine in Jammu & Kashmir, India.

The main religions in the Himalayas are Buddhism, Hinduism and Islam. Some of the important religious places in the Himalayas are:

- Sri Hemkunt Sahib, the place where the 10th Guru, Guru Gobind Singh Ji has meditated and achieved enlightenment in a previous incarnation
- Haridwar, the place where the river Ganges enters the plains.
- Badrinath, a temple dedicated to Vishnu.
- Kedarnath, where one of the 12 Jyotirlingas is located.
- Gaumukh, the source of the Bhagirathi (and hence, by extension, the Ganges), located a few miles above the town of Gangotri.
- Devprayag, where the Alaknanda and Bhagirathi merge to form the Ganges.
- Rishikesh, has a temple of Lakshmana.
- Mount Kailash, a 6,638 m high peak which Hindus believe to be the abode of Shiva and Uma, among the main deities in Hinduism, and is also venerated by Buddhists. The peak is forbidden to climb, it is so sacred it is circled at its base. Lake Manasarowar lies at the base of Mount Kailash, and is the source of the Brahmaputra.
- Amarnath, has a natural Shiva linga of ice which forms for a few weeks each year. Thousands of people visit this cave during these few weeks.
- The Vaishno Devi is a popular shrine among Durga devotees.

The following mystic entities are associated with the Himalayas:

- The Yeti is one of the most famous creatures in cryptozoology. It is a large primate-like creature that is supposed to live in the Himalaya. Most mainstream scientists and experts consider current evidence of the Yeti's existence unpersuasive, and the result of hoaxes, legend or misidentification of mundane creatures.
- Shambhala is a mystical city with various legends associated with it, it is one of twenty-four Himalayan hidden realms, or beyul, in Vajrayana Buddhism. While some legends consider it to be a real city where secret Buddhist doctrines are being preserved, other legends believe that the city does not physically exist, and can only be reached in the mental realm.

== In art, literature, and film ==
- Kim, by Rudyard Kipling, is the signature account of life in 19th century India as seen through British eyes and is based on the exploits of a young boy in the Himalayas and plains of India while engaged in the Great Game.
- Shangri-La is a fictional utopia situated somewhere in the Himalayas, based on the legendary Shambhala. It is described in the novel Lost Horizon, written by the British writer James Hilton in 1933.
- Tintin in Tibet is one of the series of classic comic-strip albums, written and illustrated by Belgian writer and illustrator Hergé, featuring the young reporter Tintin investigating a plane crash in the Gosain Than massif in the Himalayas. (1960)
- The Hollywood movie Vertical Limit (2000), is set in the K2 peak of the Himalayas, in Pakistan.
- Several levels of Tomb Raider II and one level in Tomb Raider: Legend of the Tomb Raider series are situated in the Himalayas.
- The Inheritance of Loss written by Kiran Desai is partly set in the Himalaya Mountains.
- Rumer Godden's novel Black Narcissus (1939) is about an order of nuns who set up a convent in the Himalayas. The film, released in 1947 by Powell and Pressburger and starring Deborah Kerr, was not actually shot in the Himalayas and relied primarily on matte paintings to evoke the mountains.
- Isabel Allende's novel, Kingdom of the Golden Dragon takes place mostly in the Forbidden Kingdom, a fictional country in the Himalayas.
- Dragon Rider is authored by Cornelia Funke and tells the story of an epic journey that a small boy, a brownie, and a dragon take to the "Rim of Heaven," a place in the Himalayas where dragons reside.
- Expedition Everest – Legend of the Forbidden Mountain is an elaborately themed roller coaster located at Disney's Animal Kingdom at Walt Disney World that takes riders through a yeti-guarded Mount Everest.
- Seven Years in Tibet is an autobiographical travel book written by Austrian mountaineer Heinrich Harrer based on his real life experiences in Tibet between 1944 and 1951 during the Second World War and the interim period before the PRC's People's Liberation Army invaded Tibet in 1950. Heinrich Harrer took part in a German mountaineering expedition to the Himalayas, intending to climb Nanga Parbat, the ninth-highest mountain in the world.
- Seven Years in Tibet (1997 film) is a 1997 film based on the book of the same name written by Austrian mountaineer Heinrich Harrer.
- Journey of a Red Fridge (2007), directed by Lucian and Natasa Muntean (Lunam Docs), is a documentary that tells the story of child porters working in the Himalayan mountains of Nepal.
- G.I. Joe: The Movie is a 1987 animated feature, in which an ancient civilization known as Cobra-La has taken refuge deep within the Himalayas after the Ice Age, which nearly wiped them off the face of the Earth.
- Himalaya: Ladder to Paradise, a 2015 Chinese documentary film.
- In Warhammer 40,000, the Imperial Palace in which the God-Emperor is interred was built into the Himalayas.
