= Dallen J. Timothy =

American tourism geographer and academic

- Education: University of Waterloo (PhD), Western University (MA), Brigham Young University (BSc)
- Known for: tourism, borders and geopolitics, heritage management
- Scientific career
- Fields: human geography, environmental studies, heritage, geopolitics, tourism
- Workplaces: Arizona State University

Dallen J. Timothy is an American and Canadian human geographer and professor in the School of Community Resources and Development at Arizona State University, in Phoenix, Arizona, USA. He is a Senior Global Futures Scientist at the Julie Anne Wrigley Global Futures Laboratory at the same university. Professor Timothy is also a Senior Research Associate at the University of Johannesburg, South Africa; Research Associate at Khazar University, Azerbaijan; Visiting Research Professor at Ningxia University, China; Honorary Professor at the University of Jordan, Amman, Jordan; and Visiting Professor in the Master's of Tourism Management program at the University of Girona, Spain.

== Early life ==
Timothy was born in St. George, Utah, and grew up in the nearby town of Hurricane, Utah. He spent his junior year of high school as a Rotary Club exchange student in Finland, after which he returned home to graduate from Hurricane High School in 1985. After high school, Timothy volunteered for two years as a missionary in Finland for The Church of Jesus Christ of Latter-day Saints. He speaks Finnish and studied several additional languages during his youth.

== Education ==
Timothy earned a Bachelor of Science degree in Geography from Brigham Young University in 1991, a master's degree in Geography from the University of Western Ontario (now Western University), Canada, in 1993, and a PhD (1996) from the Department of Geography at the University of Waterloo, Canada.

== Academic career ==
Following his doctoral studies, Timothy’s first academic position was in the Geography Department at Central Connecticut State University (1996-1997), followed by three years in the School of Human Movement, Sport and Leisure Studies at Bowling Green State University, Ohio. In 2000, he and his family moved to the Phoenix, Arizona, metropolitan area, where he took a professorial position at Arizona State University (ASU), with a one-year hiatus (2007-2008), which he spent in the Department of Geography at Brigham Young University in Provo, Utah. He currently researches and teaches in the School of Community Resources and Development at ASU's Downtown Phoenix campus.

== Research ==
As a human geographer, Timothy’s research and teaching specialties include the social, environmental, and economic impacts of tourism, with a particular focus on heritage protection and management, the empowerment of marginalized peoples in the Global South, international borders and border challenges, and sustainable community development. He has published more than 300 articles and more than 40 books, several of which have been translated into multiple languages. His publications have received more than 32,000 citations according to Google Scholar.

Timothy is a frequent keynote speaker at national and international conferences, appears regularly in the media, and consults with universities and government agencies throughout the world. In addition to his current international visiting professorships, he has also served as a visiting professor in Mexico, China, Malaysia, Italy, and the United Kingdom.

=== Heritage tourism ===
Timothy's research focuses on heritage tourism and cultural heritage management. His work examines the relationship between tourism, heritage conservation, destination development, and the management of cultural resources.

He co-authored Heritage Tourism with Stephen Boyd and later authored Cultural Heritage and Tourism: An Introduction.

=== Religious tourism ===
As part of his interest in cultural heritage, Timothy's research has focused on religious tourism, pilgrimage, and spirituality. His work examines the relationships between religion, sacred places, cultural heritage, and tourism, with attention to pilgrimage, religious heritage management, and spiritual travel experiences.

=== Borders and geopolitics ===
Timothy's research on borders and geopolitics explores the role of international boundaries, cross-border mobility, transboundary cooperation, and tourism development in border regions. His work has examined borders as attractions, barriers, and spaces of cooperation in tourism, migration, and human mobility.

== Editorial leadership ==
Timothy is the founding editor of the peer-reviewed academic journal Journal of Heritage Tourism. He also serves on numerous editorial boards and is the commissioning editor of several academic book series. He is an active member of the American Association of Geographers and the International Geographical Union.

== Honors and recognition ==
Timothy received the Roy Wolfe Award from the American Association of Geographers in 2005, the Lifetime Achievement Award from the International Association for Tourism Policy in 2013, and the John Rooney Applied RTS Award from the American Association of Geographers Recreation, Tourism and Sport Specialty Group in 2021.

== Legacy and influence ==
In 2022, the Journal of Heritage Tourism established the Dallen Timothy Best Paper Award in recognition of Timothy's contributions to heritage tourism research. The annual award honors the most significant and high-impact paper published in the journal during the previous year. Timothy served as the journal's founding editor from 2006 to 2020.

== Selected works ==
- Tourism and Political Boundaries. Routledge, 2001.
- Heritage Tourism (with Stephen Boyd). Prentice Hall, 2003.
- Tourism, Diasporas and Space (with Tim Coles). Routledge, 2004.
- Tourism, Religion and Spiritual Journeys (with Daniel H. Olsen). Routledge, 2006.
- Geography and Genealogy: Locating Personal Pasts (with Jean Guelke). Routledge, 2008.
- Cultural Heritage and Tourism in the Developing World (with Gyan Nyaupane). Routledge, 2009.
- Tourism and Trails: Cultural, Ecological and Management Issues (with Stephen Boyd). Channel View Publications, 2015.
- Routledge Handbook of Tourism in the Middle East and North Africa. Routledge, 2019.
- Handbook of Globalisation and Tourism. Edward Elgar, 2019.
- Contemporary Christian Travel (with Amos Ron). Channel View Publications, 2019.
- Archaeology and Tourism: Touring the Past (with Lina Tahan). Channel View Publications, 2020.
- Tourism in European Microstates and Dependencies: Geopolitics, Scale and Resource Limitations. CABI, 2021.
- Cultural Heritage and Tourism: An Introduction. Channel View Publications, 2021.
- World Regional Geography (with Alane Lew and Michael Hall). Kendall Hunt, 2022.
- The Routledge Handbook of Religious and Spiritual Tourism (with Daniel H. Olsen). Routledge, 2022.
- Tourism and Development in the Himalaya (with Gyan Nyaupane). Routledge, 2022.
- Routledge Handbook of Borders and Tourism (with Alon Gelbman). Routledge, 2023.
- Cultural Heritage and Tourism in Africa. Routledge, 2023.
- Religious Heritage and Tourism in South Asia (with Kiran Shinde). Routledge, 2026.
