= Pokhara Valley =

Valley in the hilly region of western Nepal

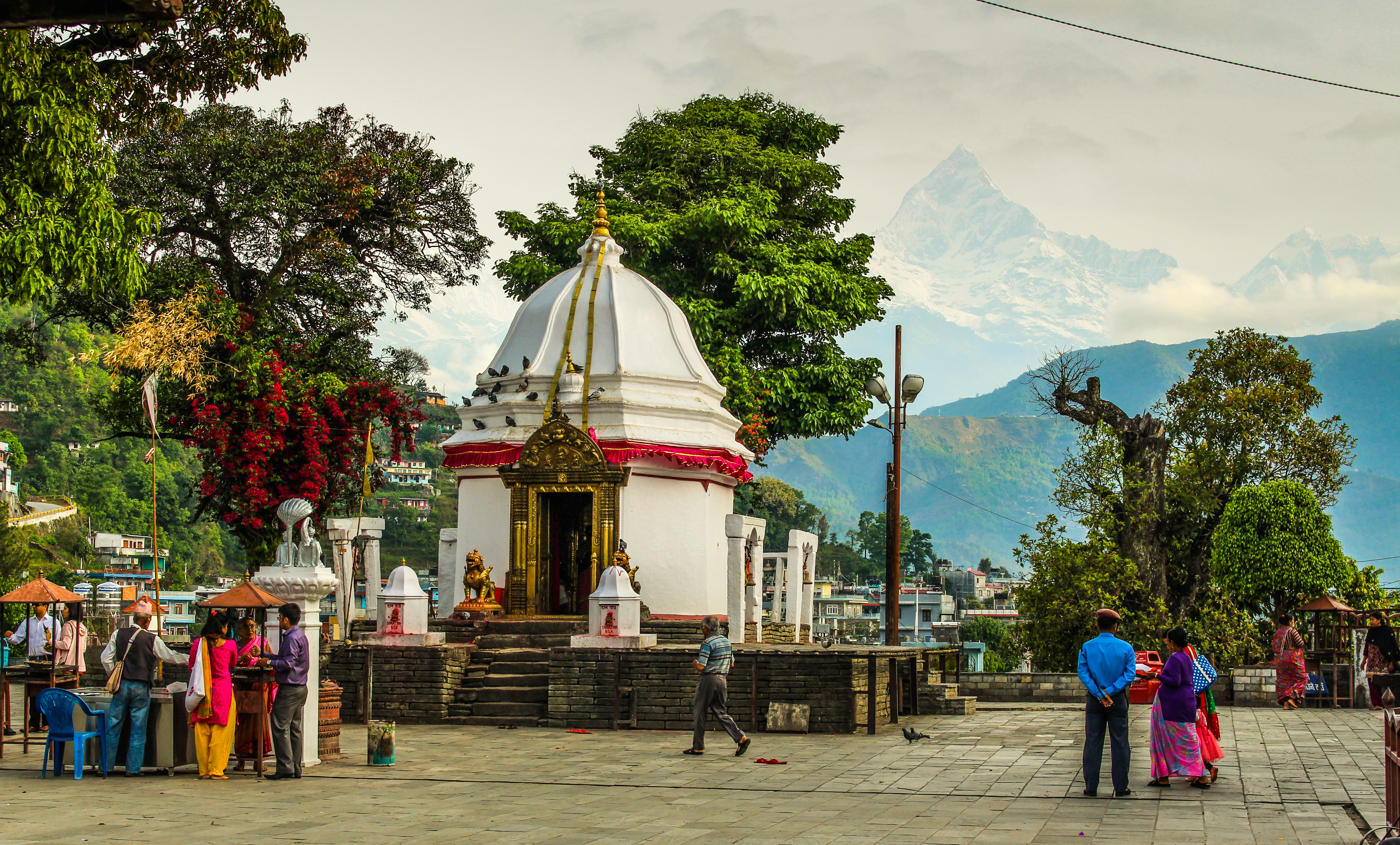
- Bindhyabasini Temple

- Location in Province Pokhara Valley (Nepal) Pokhara Valley (Asia)
- Coordinates: 28°12′30″N 83°59′20″E
- Country: Nepal
- Province: Gandaki Province
- District: Kaski District

Pokhara Valley is the second-largest valley in the hilly region of Nepal. It lies in the western part of Nepal. The cities of Pokhara and Lekhnath were in the valley, which were merged along with several neighboring VDCs to form the Pokhara-Lekhnath Metropolitan, which was later renamed to Pokhara Metropolitan City. As of 2023, Pokhara has a population of 599,504. It is located in Gandaki zone, 203 km (126 mi) west of Kathmandu Valley. The city of Pokhara is one of the major cities of Nepal and it, like Kathmandu Valley, is extremely vulnerable to earthquakes due to its clay soil and liquefaction potential.

== Geography ==
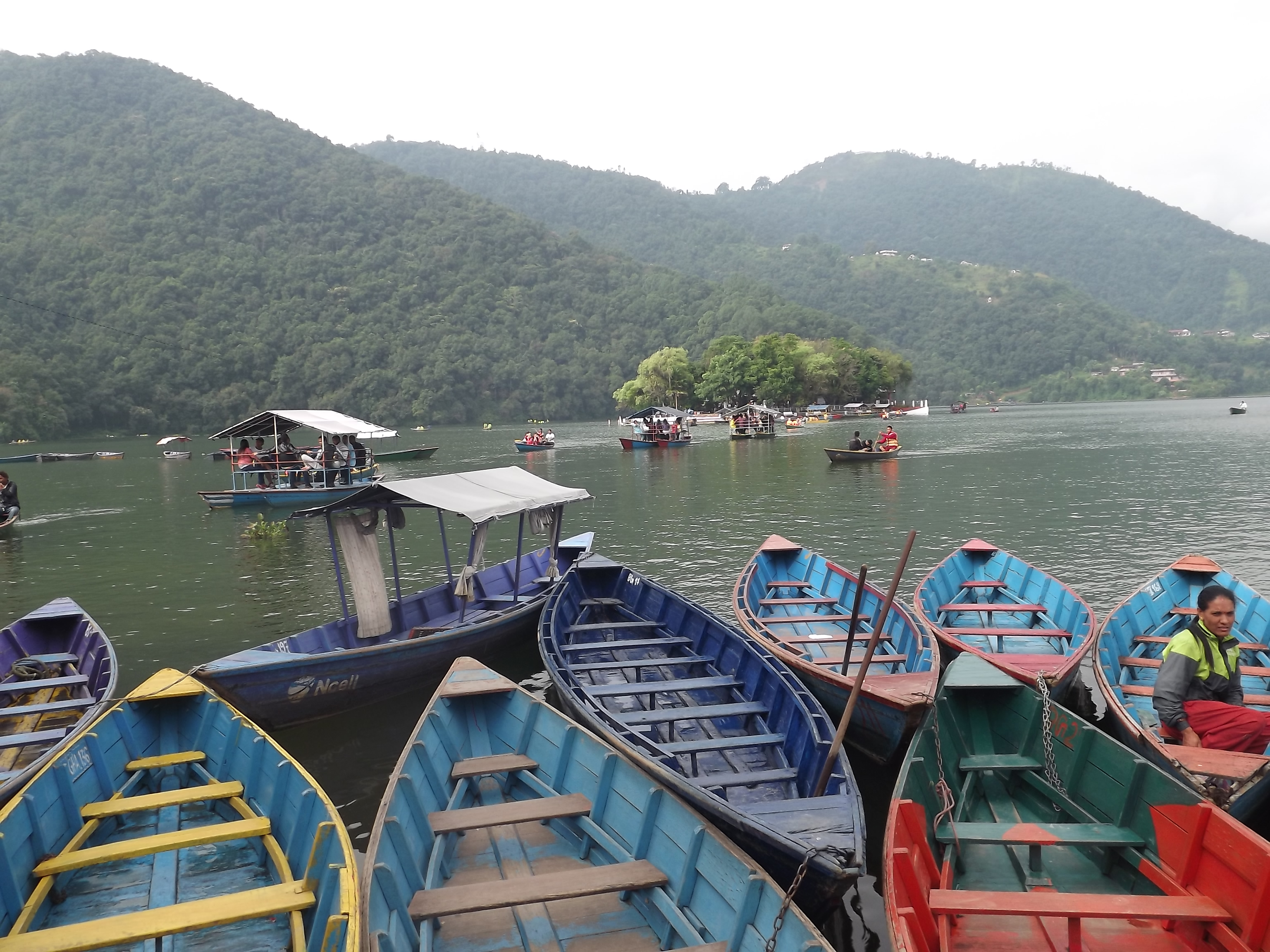
View of Tal Barahi Temple on the middle of the Phewa La

=== Lakes ===
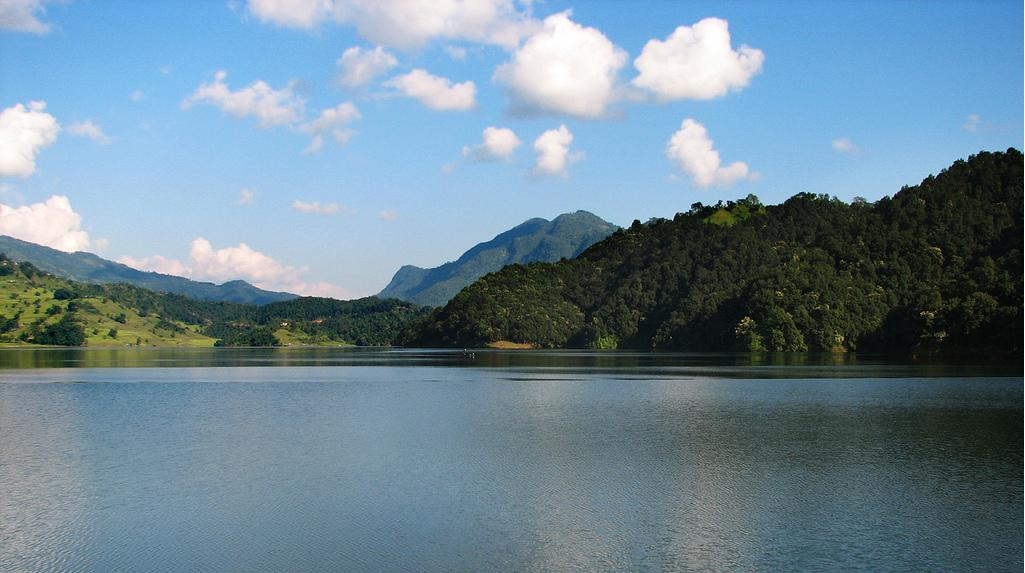
Begnas Lake

Among many lakes in Pokhara Valley, Phewa Lake is the largest. Phewa Lake is also Nepal's second largest lake, including parts of Pokhara Valley, Sarangkot, and Kaskikot. Machhapuchhre's reflection can be seen on this lake. Tal Barahi Temple is a two-storied temple, situated in the middle of the lake. In addition to Phewa Lake, Begnas Lake is another lake in Pokhara Valley, being the second largest lake in the Valley. Begnas Lake is situated at an elevation of 650 m and it covers 3 km^{2}.Rupa Lake is another prominent lake in the valley, forming part of the key freshwater wetland cluster.Other notable water bodies in the valley include Dipang Lake, which forms part of the region's interconnected freshwater wetland cluster. The valley features several other smaller freshwater bodies including Khaste, Gude, Maidi, Neurani lakes which collectively form the Lake Cluster of Pokhara Valley Ramsar site.

=== Caves ===
Mahendra Cave is one of the most visited tourist attractions in Pokhara Valley. This cave is located in a small town called Batulechaur which is a ten-minute drive from the main city. The name Mahendra Cave is given after the Late King of Nepal Mahendra Bir Bikram Shah Dev. The cave is a natural tunnel where one can walk inside and see different kinds of rocks around the wall, such as limestone, which sparkles when light strikes it. As one of the darker sights in Nepal, Mahendra Cave gives visitors the opportunity to explore the darker territory inside the tunnel. Bat Cave, which is also known as the natural habitat of bats, is also worth of visiting, and it is located a ten-minute walk away from Mahendra Cave. Bat cave is 150 m long and 25 ft. high. The main entrance of this cave is quite narrow but the inner part is wide enough. The main specialty of this cave is that there are more than 15 thousand bats of different species. Images of elephant tusks, gods, and goddesses can be observed in the inner walls of the cave.

=== International Mountain Museum ===
Main entrance of International Mountain Museum

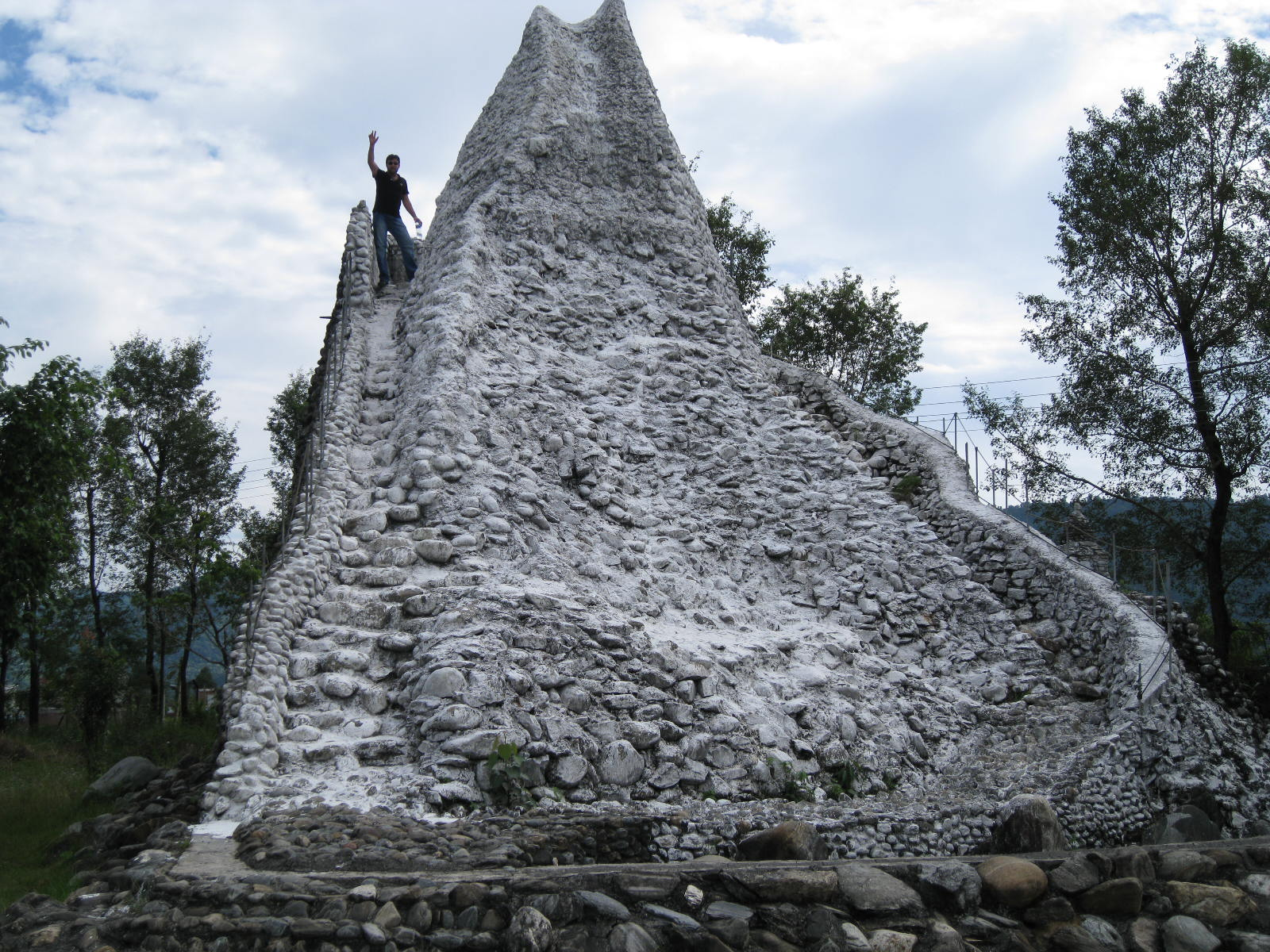
Artificial mountain at International Mountain Museum

The International Mountain Museum exhibits the past and present developments related to mountain and mountaineering around the world. It contains three main exhibition halls: Hall of Great Himalayas, Hall of Fame and Hall of World Mountains. Inside the museum, there are exhibits on famous peaks, descriptions of famous mountaineers, the culture and lifestyle of mountain people, flora and fauna including geology, in an attempt to represent the traditional culture and values of the Nepalese people.
