= Neureni Lake =

Neureni lake
- Niureni Lake
- Location within Nepal Location within Tibet Location within India
- Location: Lekhnath municipality, Kaski District, Nepal
- Coordinates: 28°11′30″N 84°02′55″E
- Type: lake

Neurani Lake

Neureni Lake also known as Niureni Lake and Nyureni Lake is a freshwater lake located in the Lekhnath municipality of Kaski, Nepal. It has also been listed under the Ramsar convention along with the lakes Phewa, Begnas, Rupa, Dipang, Maidi, Khaste, Kamaltal and Gude Lake.
