= Tourism in Pokhara =

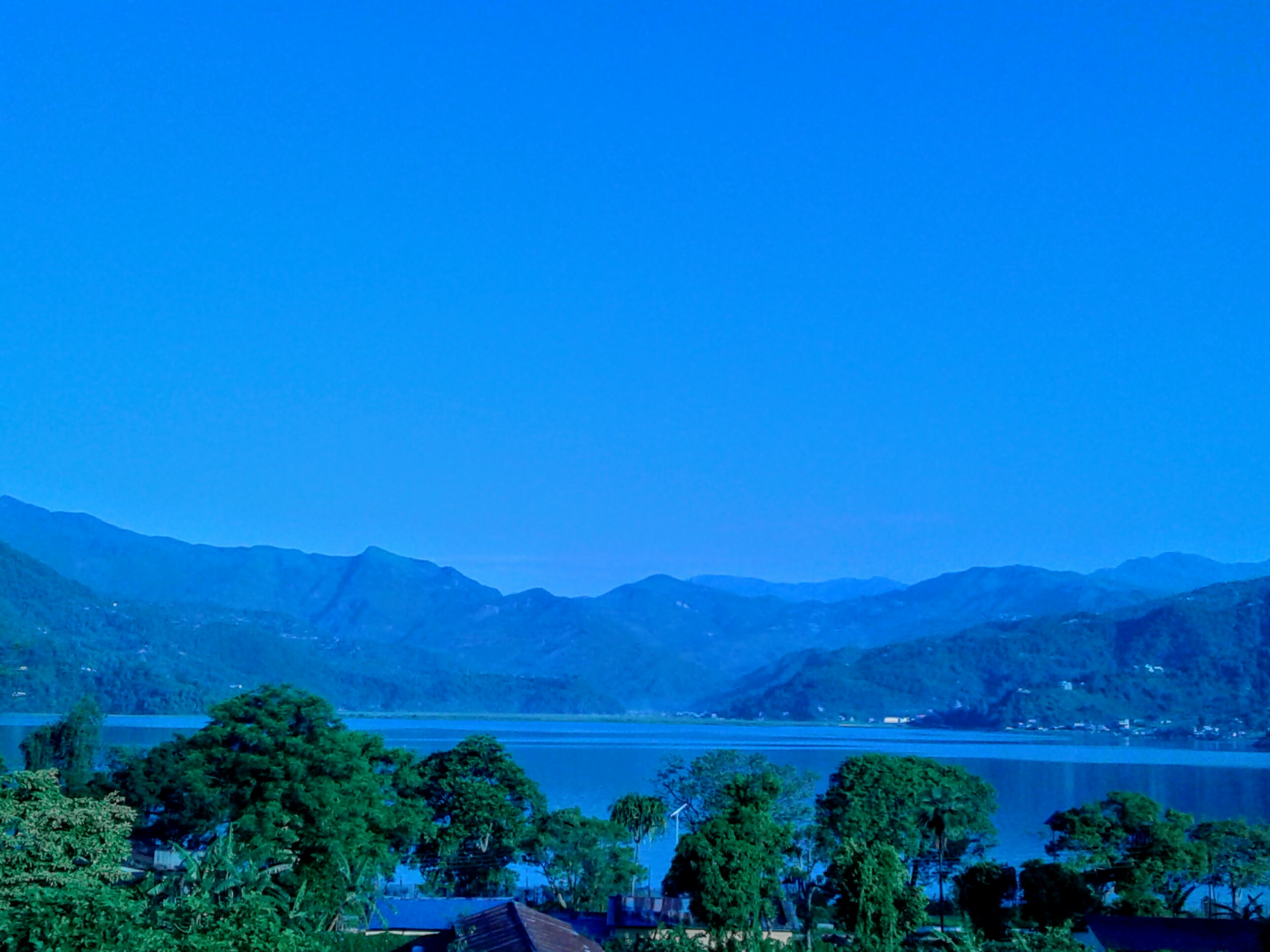
- Phewa Lake with the Annapurna range in the background
- Country: Nepal
- Province: Gandaki Province
- District: Kaski District

Tourism in Pokhara is a major contributor to the economy of Pokhara, Nepal's second-largest city and the provincial capital of Gandaki Province. Situated at an elevation of approximately 827 metres (2,713 ft) above sea level on the shores of Phewa Lake, Pokhara is widely regarded as the tourism capital of Nepal, a title officially conferred on 17 March 2024 by Prime Minister Pushpa Kamal Dahal at a ceremony at Barahighat near Phewa Lake. The city serves as the primary gateway to the Annapurna Conservation Area and the world-famous Annapurna Circuit trek, offering visitors a combination of Himalayan scenery, adventure sports, and cultural heritage.

== Background and history ==
Until the end of the 1960s, Pokhara was accessible only by foot and was considered a remote, almost mystical place. The completion of the Siddhartha Highway in 1968 transformed the city's accessibility, and tourism rapidly expanded thereafter. The lakeside area along Phewa Lake — known as Lakeside (also called Baidam) — gradually evolved from a trekkers' camping ground into one of Nepal's principal tourism hubs, lined with hotels, restaurants, cafés, and shops.

Pokhara has been a main tourist destination since the early 1950s, when Nepal's tourism industry, especially mountaineering, first commenced.

== Economic significance ==
Tourism, along with the broader service sector, contributes approximately 58% of Pokhara's local economy, with agriculture contributing around 16% and remittances about 20%. Tourism is the primary source of income for local residents and the city as a whole. Local tourism entrepreneurs estimate that approximately 400,000 foreign tourists visit Pokhara annually, with domestic tourists accounting for roughly 30 per cent of annual hotel occupancy.

At the national level, Nepal's tourism sector contributed approximately NPR 327.9 billion to the economy in 2023, supporting around 1.19 million jobs across the country. The Annapurna Circuit alone accounts for approximately 55.8% of Nepal's annual trekking tourists, most of whom begin their journey in Pokhara.

Nepal received 1,147,567 international visitors in 2024, a 13.1% increase over 2023, reaching 96% of pre-pandemic levels.

== Accommodation ==
Pokhara has a diverse accommodation sector ranging from luxury five-star properties to budget guesthouses. The city has two 5-star hotels, one 4-star hotel, five 3-star hotels, fifteen 2-star hotels, and approximately 305 total registered hotels. The inauguration of the Pokhara Regional International Airport (PRIA) — built with approximately US$216 million in Chinese loan assistance — has created expectations of further growth in tourist arrivals and hotel occupancy, though the airport had yet to operate at full international capacity as of early 2025.

The Pokhara Metropolitan City launched the Pokhara Visit Year 2025 campaign on 15 February 2025, in coordination with the Nepal Tourism Board and the private sector, setting a target of welcoming 2 million tourists during the year.

== Natural attractions ==
=== Phewa Lake ===
Fewa Lake Pokhara in 2026 04

Phewa Lake (also spelt Fewa Tal) is the second-largest lake in Nepal, covering approximately 4.43 square kilometres. The lake is famous for its tranquil waters, the reflection of the Annapurna range on its surface, and boating activities. The Tal Barahi Temple, an 18th-century Hindu temple dedicated to Lord Vishnu situated on an island in the middle of the lake, is one of Pokhara's most iconic religious landmarks.

=== Begnas Lake and Rupa Lake ===
Together with Phewa Lake, Begnas Lake and Rupa Lake form the three major lakes of the Pokhara valley. Begnas Lake is the second largest of the eight lakes in the valley, located about 40 minutes by bus from Pokhara city centre, and is known for its fishing, boating, and undisturbed natural environment. Rupa Lake, situated in the southeast of Pokhara at an altitude of 600 metres, is noted for the diversity of flora and fauna it supports.

=== Devi's Fall ===
Devi's Fall (locally known as Patale Chhango) is a prominent waterfall located approximately 2 kilometres south-west of Pokhara Airport on the Siddhartha Highway. The waterfall is notable for plunging into a hidden underground gorge.

=== Sarangkot ===
Sarangkot is a prominent hilltop viewpoint located northwest of the city, offering panoramic views of the Annapurna and Dhaulagiri mountain ranges. It serves as the primary takeoff point for paragliding activities.

== Trekking ==
Pokhara is the starting point for several of Nepal's most celebrated trekking routes:

- Annapurna Circuit: A legendary trekking route spanning approximately 160–230 kilometres, taking around 15–20 days to complete. It encompasses diverse landscapes, high mountain passes, and cultural villages.
- Annapurna Base Camp (ABC) Trek: A shorter but highly popular route leading directly into the heart of the Annapurna Sanctuary.
- Ghorepani Poon Hill Trek: Located at an elevation of 3,210 metres, it is one of Nepal's most preferred shorter trekking trails and is particularly popular during the rhododendron blooming season (March–April).
- Mardi Himal Trek: A less-crowded alternative trek offering views of Machhapuchhre (Fishtail Mountain, 6,993 m) and Mardi Himal.
- Muktinath–Mustang Loop: A combination route passing through the ancient walled kingdom of Lo Manthang in Upper Mustang.

About 80% of tourists who visit Pokhara express a desire to explore the Annapurna region for purposes such as trekking and study.

The city recorded 181,000 trekkers in 2019 before the COVID-19 pandemic severely reduced figures to 18,796 in 2020 and 16,105 in 2021, before a recovery to 129,000 trekkers in 2022 and further rebound in 2023.

== Adventure tourism ==
Pokhara is widely recognised as Nepal's primary hub for adventure tourism. Key activities include:

=== Paragliding ===
Paragliding from Sarangkot is one of the most popular adventure activities in Nepal. Tandem flights allow beginners to experience the Himalayan panorama from the air, with landing zones near the Lakeside area.

=== Zip-lining ===
High Ground Zip-Flyer and Superman Zip-Line are two of Pokhara's most popular zip-line routes. The Zip Flyer Nepal is recognised as the world's steepest zipline, with a vertical drop of over 2,000 metres across 1.8 kilometres at speeds of up to 160 km/h (100 mph).

=== Bungee jumping ===
Pokhara is home to the Kushma-Parbat bungee jump, offering a 70-metre vertical drop. It is among the highest bungee jumping sites in the Himalayas.

=== White-water rafting ===
The rivers around Pokhara offer some of Nepal's best white-water rafting experiences. The Upper Seti River provides Class 3 and 4 rapids and is suitable for families and beginners. The Trishuli River, which flows along the Prithvi Highway between Kathmandu and Pokhara, is the most popular river for rafting day trips.

=== Boating and water sports ===
Phewa Lake offers boating opportunities, and the Lakeside area has numerous operators providing rowing boats and paddle boats.

=== Golf ===
Pokhara has two golf courses, taking advantage of the city's open terrain and mild climate.

== Museums ==
=== International Mountain Museum (IMM) ===
Opened in February 2004 and situated approximately 1.5 km south of Pokhara Airport at Rato Pairo, the IMM is managed by the Nepal Mountaineering Association. It contains three main exhibition halls: the Hall of the Great Himalaya, the Hall of Fame, and the Hall of World Mountains, along with a library, prayer room, and audio-visual room. The museum documents historical records and chronicles of mountaineering worldwide.

=== Pokhara Regional Museum ===
Located between the bus stop and Mahendra Pul, this ethnographic museum showcases the cultural heritage of western Nepal, with exhibits on the lifestyles and histories of the Gurung, Thakali, and Tharu ethnic groups, including models, photographs, and artefacts.

=== Annapurna Natural History Museum ===
Located at Prithvi Narayan Campus east of the old bazaar and run by the Annapurna Conservation Area Project (ACAP), this museum houses a collection of butterflies, insects, birds, and models of local wildlife.

== Religious and cultural sites ==
=== World Peace Pagoda ===
The World Peace Pagoda was built in 1996 on a hilltop across the southern shore of Phewa Lake by Japanese Buddhist monk Nichidatsu Fujii. It is one of Pokhara's two major viewpoints promoted by the city.

=== Bindhyabasini Temple ===
One of the oldest temples in Pokhara, Bindhyabasini Temple is dedicated to Goddess Bhagwati (a form of Durga) and is located on a hilltop in the old bazaar area, offering views of the Annapurna range.

=== Tibetan Settlements ===
Pokhara has four Tibetan refugee settlements — Jampaling, Paljorling, Tashi Ling, and Tashi Palkhel — each with a gompa (Buddhist monastery) and traditional Tibetan architecture. These settlements have become tourist attractions offering handmade jewellery, carpets, carvings, and an insight into Tibetan exile culture.

=== Shree Gaden Dhargay Ling Monastery ===
A Tibetan Buddhist monastery located in Pokhara, it was established to promote Buddhist teachings and offers a peaceful environment for meditation.

== Seasons and climate ==
Pokhara is warmer than Kathmandu. Peak tourist seasons are:

- Autumn (September–November): Clear skies, excellent mountain visibility, and ideal trekking conditions. October and November are the most popular months, historically seeing hotel occupancy rates of 90–95%.
- Winter (December–February): Mild and pleasant compared to Kathmandu; limited trekking due to snow at high altitudes.
- Spring (March–May): Mild temperatures and blooming rhododendrons, favourable for trekking.
- Monsoon (June–August): Fewer international tourists due to heavy rainfall, though domestic tourism continues.

== Infrastructure and connectivity ==
=== Pokhara Regional International Airport ===
The Pokhara Regional International Airport (PRIA) was constructed with a loan of approximately US$216 million from China and opened in 2023. While it is equipped to handle international flights, operations had not fully commenced at international scale as of early 2025, with only chartered flights utilising the facility. Domestic flights connect Pokhara and Kathmandu in approximately 25–30 minutes, while overland travel via the Prithvi Highway takes 6–8 hours.

== Challenges ==
Despite its success as a tourism destination, Pokhara faces several ongoing challenges:

- Environmental pressures: Encroachment upon Phewa Lake threatens this important natural and tourist asset. Growing air pollution poses additional environmental concerns.
- Post-pandemic recovery: Hotel occupancy, which historically reached 90–95% during peak months, dropped to 40–45% in 2024 peak season, with some hotels reporting as low as 30–35% occupancy, reflecting incomplete recovery from the COVID-19 pandemic.
- Airport utilisation: Significant public investment in PRIA has not yet translated into commensurate growth in foreign tourist arrivals.
- Trekking route displacement: The extension of motorable roads into trekking areas has reduced the number of trekkers on iconic routes such as the Annapurna Circuit, prompting calls for government intervention to preserve these trails.

== See also ==
- Tourism in Nepal
- Annapurna Conservation Area
- Phewa Lake
- Annapurna Circuit
- Pokhara
- Nepal Tourism Board
