= Pokhara University =

University in Pokhara, Nepal

- पोखरा विश्वविद्यालय
- Type: Public university
- Established: 1997 (29 years ago)
- Budget: Rs. 1.54 billion (US$10.3 million) (2025–26)
- Chancellor: Prime Minister of Nepal
- Vice-Chancellor: Dr. Devendra Adhikari
- Academic staff: ~257 teaching staff
- Students: 34,151
- Location: Pokhara, Gandaki, Nepal; 28.1473°N 84.0822°E
- Campus: 1,000 acres (400 ha); Midsize city
- Colors
- Website: www.pu.edu.np

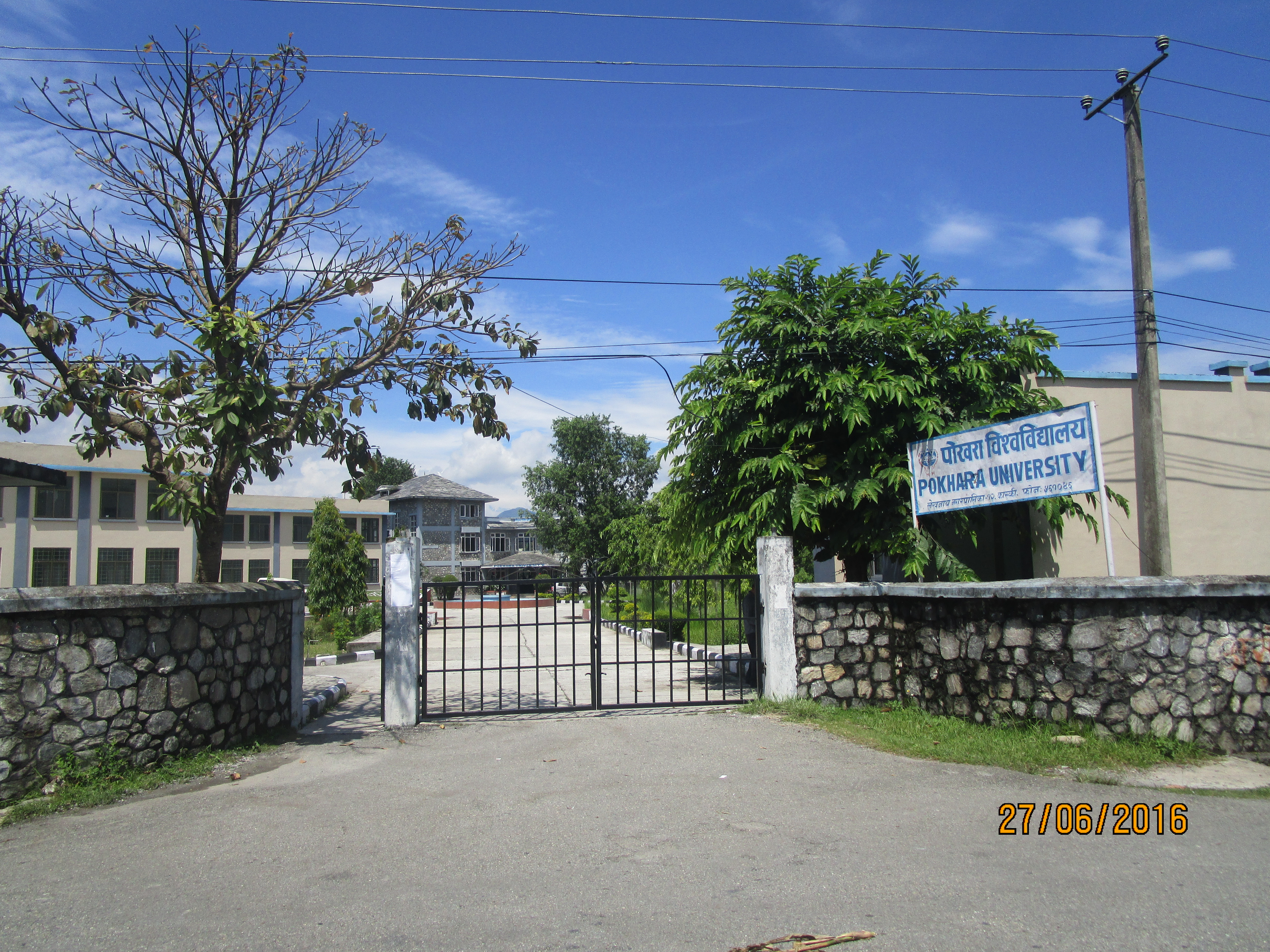
The entrance of Pokhara University

Pokhara University (PU or PoU) (Nepali: पोखरा विश्वविद्यालय) was established in 1997 (2054 B.S.) and is Nepal's fifth university. Its central office is located in Pokhara, Kaski District, Gandaki Province. Along with Purbanchal University, PU was formed as part of a government initiative to improve access to higher education. The Prime Minister of Nepal is the university chancellor and the Minister of Education is the pro-chancellor. The vice chancellor is the principal administrator of the university.

== Location ==
Pokhara University in 2007

Pokhara University is located in Khudi-Dhungepatan, Pokhara Lekhnath Municipality, Kaski District, 13 km east of Pokhara city (Prithvi Chowk). It also operates an academic complex in Seven Lake City, Lekhnath, surrounded by several peaks of the Himalayan mountain range. Begnas Lake and Rupa Lake are within walking distance of the university's central office.

The School of Engineering, the School of Health & Allied Sciences, the School of Business, and the School of Development and Social Engineering are housed in buildings located on the bank of the Khudi river.

There are multiple affiliated colleges throughout the country, distributing various courses.

== Academic offerings ==
Pokhara University began offering degrees following the Pokhara University Act of 1997.

Pokhara University has four constituent schools where Bachelor's, Master's, and PhD degree programs are offered. There are 57 academic institutions affiliated with PU, also offering Bachelor's, Master's, M.Phil. and PhD. degree programs.

== Teaching ==
The university uses a semester system. All bachelor's degrees are four years (delivered over eight semesters) and master's degrees are an additional two years (delivered over an additional four semesters). The Philosophy degree requires one and a half years (three semesters) of study. The medium of instruction for all programs is English.

There are four faculties:

- Faculty of Science and Technology
- Faculty of Management Studies
- Faculty of Humanities and Social Sciences
- Faculty of Health Sciences

== Constituent campuses ==
=== Affiliated Colleges ===
- Cosmos College of Management and Technology, [Sitapaila, Kathmandu]], Nepal
- Nepal Engineering College, Bhaktapur, Nepal
- School of Environmental Science and Management, Kathmandu, Nepal
- Brihaspati College, Goligadh-9, Rupandehi, Nepal
- Tilottama Campus, Yogikuti, Rupandehi, Nepal
- Gandaki College of Engineering and Science, Kaski District, Nepal
- Institute of Advance Communication Education and Research Center, Kathmandu, Nepal
- Nepal Tourism and Hotel Management College, Kaski, Nepal
- Pokhara Engineering College, Kaski, Nepal
- Ace Institute of Management, Kathmandu, Nepal
- Apex College, Kathmandu, Nepal
- V.S. Niketan College, Kathmandu, Nepal
- Universal Engineering & Science College, Lalitpur, Nepal
- National Open College, Lalitpur, Nepal
- LA Grande International College, Kaski, Nepal
- Crimson College of Technology, Rupandehi, Nepal
- Oxford College of Engineering and Management, Nawalparasi, Nepal
- Lumbini Engineering College, Rupandehi, Nepal
- National Academy of Science and Technology, Kailali, Nepal
- Nepal College of Information Technology, Lalitpur, Nepal
- Nobel College, Kathmandu, Nepal
- Everest Engineering and Management College, Kathmandu, Nepal
- Pokhara College of Management, Kaski, Nepal
- Brixton College, Kanchanpur, Nepal
- Excel Business College, Kathmandu, Nepal
- Atlantic International College, Kathmandu, Nepal
- Axis College, Rupandehi, Nepal
- Liberty College, Kathmandu, Nepal
- Siddhartha International College, Rupandehi, Nepal
- Camad College, Kathmandu, Nepal
- Uniglobe College, Kathmandu, Nepal
- Citizen College, Lalitpur, Nepal
- SAIM College, Lalitpur, Nepal
- Kshitiz International College, Rupandehi, Nepal
- Quest International College, Lalitpur, Nepal
- Alpine Management College, Banke, Nepal
- Platinum Management College, Kathmandu, Nepal
- Amity College, Kanchanpur, Nepal
- Victoria International College, Dang, Nepal
- Rapti Engineering College, Dang, Nepal
- Nepal Western Management and Engineering College, Kailali, Nepal
- Ritz Hospitality Management College, Lalitpur, Nepal
- Shahid Ramnath Dahal Smriti College, Kathmandu, Nepal
- Boston International College, Chitwan, Nepal
- CIST College, Kathmandu, Nepal
- Butwal Model College, Rupandehi, Nepal
- Apollo International College, Kathmandu, Nepal
- United Technical College, Chitwan, Nepal
- Modern Technical College, Lalitpur, Nepal
- Rajdhani Model College, Kathmandu, Nepal
- Atharva Business College, Kathmandu, Nepal
- Shubhashree College of Management
- Medhavi College, Kathmandu, Nepal
- Valley State College, Chitwan, Nepal
- Imperial Business College, Kathmandu, Nepal
- Central College of Business Management, Kathmandu, Nepal
- Malpi International College, Kathmandu, Nepal
- College of Engineering & Management, Banke, Nepal

=== Constituent colleges (5) ===
- School of Business
- School of Health and Allied Sciences
- School of Engineering
- School of Development and Social Engineering
- Shramik Shanti Campus (Established in 2025), Chyasal Lalitpur

=== Joint constituent colleges (4) ===
- B.P. Koirala Memorial Cancer Hospital Nursing College, Chitwan, Nepal
- Madan Bhandari College of Engineering, Urlabari, Morang
- Himalaya Eye Institute, Kaski, Nepal
- Tilganga Institute of Ophthalmology, Kathmandu, Nepal

== Scholarship ==
As the largest scholarship-providing university in Nepal, Pokhara University provides scholarships to 10 percent of approved students in affiliated colleges and 20 percent of approved students in constituent schools. Graduates from either government or non-government schools or colleges are eligible to apply for scholarships and other financial support.

Up until 2017, any students who passed the SLC test in government schools were eligible to receive scholarships; however, starting in 2021, students who have graduated from class 6 through 10 at a government school are given priority. Any remaining scholarships are then distributed to students who graduated from class 10 at a government school. Students from non-government schools can also apply, but it is nearly impossible for them to receive a scholarship under this new scheme.

The PU Scholarship Selection Examination determines eligibility to receive scholarships based on applicants' entrance scores and other credentials.
