= 106.6 FM =

FM radio frequency

This is a list of radio stations that broadcast on FM frequency 106.6 MHz:

== China ==
- CNR Business Radio in Guangzhou
- CNR Music Radio in Qujing
- CNR Story Radio in Beijing

== Indonesia ==
- Celebrities Radio in Jakarta

== Malaysia ==
- Lite in Perlis, Kedah, and Penang

== Nepal ==
- Radio Lekhnath in Lekhnath

== United Kingdom ==
- BCB 106.6fm in Bradford, West Yorkshire
- Greatest Hits Radio Derbyshire in the Peak District
- Greatest Hits Radio Sussex in Midhurst
- Koast Radio 106.6FM in South East Northumberland
- Nation Radio South Coast in Bournemouth, Poole and Winchester
- Radio Wester Ross in Loch Ewe
- Smooth East Midlands in Nottingham
- Time 106.6 in East Berkshire and South Buckinghamshire (closed October 2015)
- Wycombe Sound in High Wycombe, South Buckinghamshire

== Mongolia ==
- Mongolian National Radio Broadcaster FM106.6 (Radio station:Ulaanbaatar, Ulgii, Altai, Dalanzadgad, Choibalsan, Mörön)
