= Lekhnath (disambiguation) =

Lekhnath may refer to:

- Lekhnath, Former municipality in Kaski District, Nepal
- Lekhnath Paudyal, Nepali writer
- Lekh Nath Acharya, Nepali politician
- Lekh Nath Neupane, Nepali politician
- Radio Lekhnath, Radio station in Pokhara
