= Trekking Agencies Association of Nepal =

Umbrella organization in Nepal

- Abbreviation: TAAN
- Formation: 28 May 1978; 48 years ago
- Founder: Ambica Shrestha
- Founded at: Kathmandu, Nepal
- Type: Nonprofit
- Purpose: Mountain Tourism, Trekking
- Headquarters: Kathmandu, Nepal
- Location: Kathmandu, Nepal
- Members: Over 2,100
- President: Nilhari Bastola
- General Secretary: Binod Sapkota
- Treasurer: Purushotam Timalsena
- Executive Committee 2022-2024: Khum Bahadur Subedi, Krishna Prasad Dahal, Pradip Pandit, Dhan Bahadur Gurung, Homnath Bhattarai, Chhing Dorchi Sherpa, Ram Prasad Banjara, Raju Aryal, Sajana Tripathi, Kumar Lama, Ganesh Bahadur Adhikari, Lakpa Dorje Sherpa, Naminath Devkota, Subas Bhandari, Krishna Bahadur Pariyar, Buddha Kumari Adhikari, Gagan Raj Neupane, Hem Bahadur Karkim, Purushotam Rimal, Ramesh Pandey, Sunil Silwal, Dharma Raj Panthi (President TAAN Gandaki Province)
- Key people: Ram Chandra Sedai (CEO)
- Affiliations: Nepal Tourism Board; Government of Nepal
- Website: www.taan.org.np
- Formerly called: Trekking Agent Association of Nepal
- Save our Trekking Trails for Sustainable Tourism

The Trekking Agencies Association of Nepal (TAAN) is a national umbrella organization of trekking agencies in Nepal. TAAN was founded in 1978 with the goal of promoting mountain tourism and trekking in Nepal. TAAN oversees the volunteer effort to build, maintain, protect, and promote the trekking trail in Nepal. There are more than 2000 registered trekking agencies as members of TAAN. TAAN is registered as a non profit organization at the Kathamandu district admission office and also listed with the Social Welfare Council.

The TAAN is responsible for administering trekking permits for trekking in national parks and protected areas of Nepal, with the help of the Trekkers Information Management System (TIMS).

TAAN has been lobbying for the establishment of a One Trekker, One Guide system since 2012 for the safety of travelers and to increase employment in the tourism industry. In April 2023, TAAN and the Nepal Tourism Board implemented the new regulation of the TIMS card, under which international trekkers must have a guide or porter while trekking in Nepal.

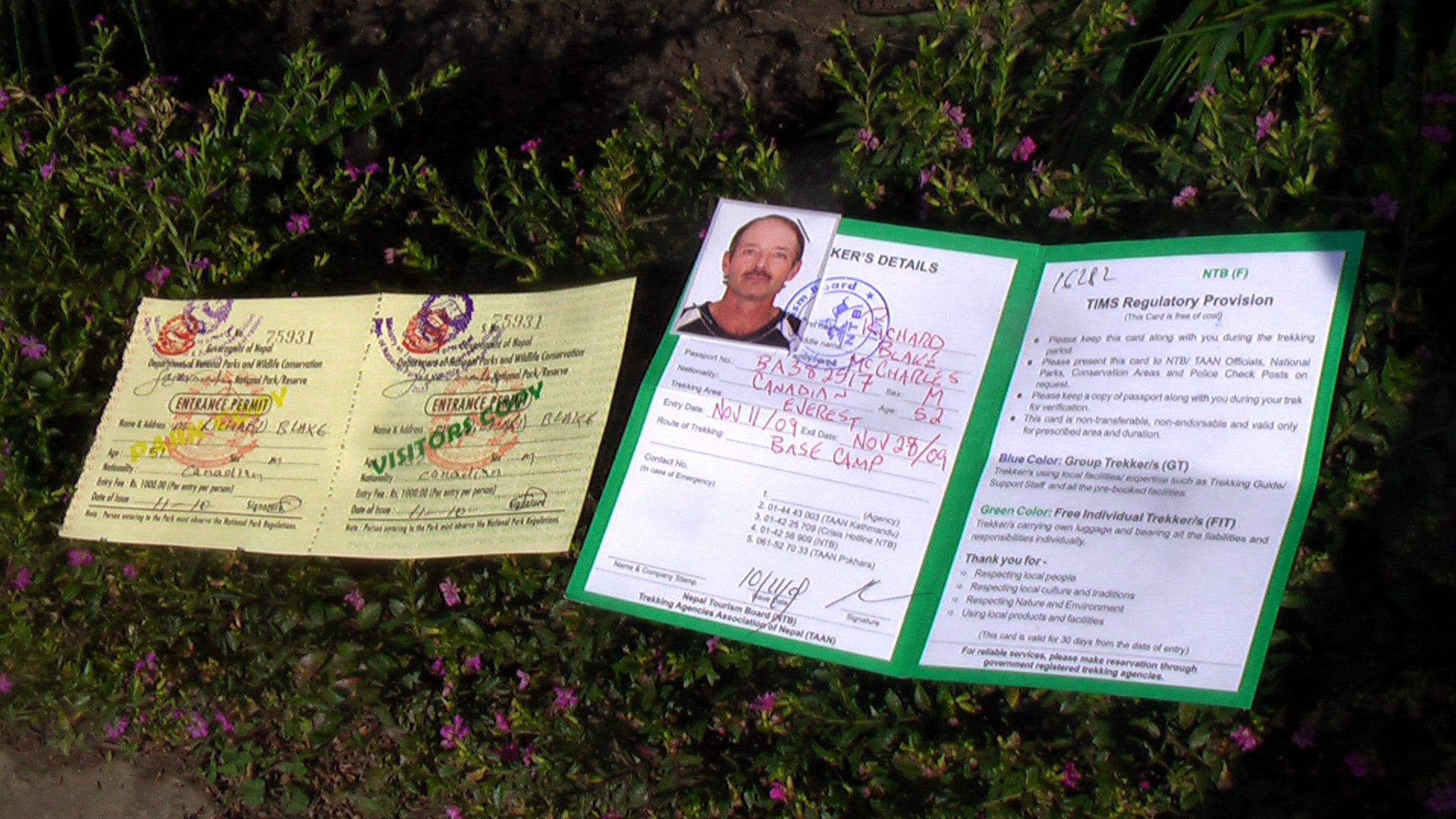
Everest (Sagarmatha) National Park permit and TIMS card in 2009

== History ==
TAAN was initially named as Trekking Agents Association of Nepal. In October 2004, the Trekking Agencies Association of Nepal (TAAN) played a significant role in the rescue efforts during Cyclone Hudhud by coordinating with travel agencies to gather information on the trekkers.

The World Food Programme (WFP) collaborated with TAAN after the 2015 earthquake to open community trails, reconstruct trekking trails, and distribute relief materials in several Village Development Committees (VDCs) in the Rasuwa, Dhading, and Gorkha Districts.

== See also ==
- Trekking peak
- Nepal Mountaineering Association
