= City of Seven Lakes =

City of Seven Lakes may refer to:

- San Pablo, Laguna, Philippines
- Lekhnath, Gandaki Province, Nepal
- Bishoftu, Oromia, Ethiopia
