= Nanglo Bakery Cafe =

Restaurant in Nepal

The Bakery Cafe Pvt.Ltd
- Company type: Restaurant
- Founded: 1991
- Founder: Shyam Sundar Lal Kakshapati
- Headquarters: Nepal
- Number of locations: 4
- Number of employees: 290 including 45 hearing impaired
- Website: www.thebakerycafe.com.np

The Bakery Cafe Pvt.Ltd is a restaurant chain in Nepal. The chain is recognized in Nepal as an entriprise to employ hearing impaired people as waiter and waitresses. The first cafe of the chain was established in 1991 at Teendhara, Kathmandu. The Bakery Cafe during its early days was considered to be a trend setter in the restaurant culture in Nepal.

Currently, it owns cafes at Jawalakhel, New Baneswor, Pulchowk, Teendhara. Its flagship restaurant at Durbarmarg was closed in 2014 due to expiry of lease contract.

== History ==
The original name of the cafe was The Bakery Cafe which was established in 1991. It is one of the early cafe established in Nepal. During that time, it was even difficult to find the buns and breads in Nepal. This led to opening of bakery factory by its owner in 1982, to supply the bakery products for the restaurant. In 1991, the restaurant was officially registered.

== Social significance ==
The chain took the initiative to hire hearing impaired people to run the restaurant in 1997 when they opened their chain at New Baneshowor. Initially, it was an experiment, and the disabled were trained by the owner himself. Later, when the company decided to hire them permanently, a formal training was conducted to teach them English and sign language. The Hotel Association of Nepal and the Austrian-Salzburg Hotel Management School conducted the training. These waiters and waitresses can take order using gestures bivalent with Nepali Sign Language.

The cafe also served as a meeting point for various political activities in Nepal during the democratic movement in 1991s.

== Restaurant Locations ==
The group has restaurants in the following locations:

- Kathmandu
  - New Baneshwor
  - Teendhara
- Lalitpur
  - Jawalakhel
  - Pulchowk
