= Lekhnath =

Lekhnath Municipality लेखनाथ नगरपालिका Garden City of Seven Lakes
- Former Municipality
- Location in Nepal Lekhnath Municipality (Nepal)
- Coordinates: 28°30′N 84°12′E
- Country: Nepal
- Province: Gandaki Province
- District: Kaski District
- Established: 1997
- merged to Pokhara: 2017

Area
  - Total: 123.11 km^{2} (47.53 sq mi)

Population (2011)
  - Total: 71,434
  - Density: 580.25/km^{2} (1,502.8/sq mi)
- Time zone: UTC+5:45 (NST)
- Website: currently at Pokhara Lekhnath Metropolitan City (Note: Old website is not maintained anymore.)

Lekhnath (Nepali: लेखनाथ नगरपालिका) was a municipality in Kaski District in the Gandaki Province of northern-central Nepal, about 180 km west of Kathmandu. It has now been merged into Pokhara sub-metropolitan city to form Pokhara metropolis. Pokhara Valley was politically divided between Pokhara city and Lekhnath which occupied the eastern half of the valley. There were 18 wards in total in Lekhnath municipality before the merger, with a VDC Bharat Pokhari that had been added at a later stage.

== Population ==
Total population of Lekhnath was 71,434 per 2011 census. Composition of the population was 86% Hindu, 8% Buddhist and 6% others. According to another statistics by the Population Census (C), Lekhnath has seen population changes from 30,107 as of 22 June 1991 (Note: The linked page shows a map and two tables. To find data for the location you search, go to the lower part of the page and in the "Major cities" table, select the location you search on the left column; then the second table, "Cities & Urban Municipalities" will show the population statistics as well as the status of the location you selected (city/municipality). You will find a red square marking the location the statistics point to.) contrasted to 41,369 (28 May 2001 per Population Census (Cf)) and 59,498 (22 June 2011 per Population Census (Cf)).

== Etymology ==
Lekhnath, or literally meaning novelist in Nepali language, was named after the famous Nepali poet Lekhnath Paudyal (1885–1966), who was born at Arghaun Archale, or ward No.6 (before the merger) of Lekhnath Municipality. The city was also entitled as the garden city of seven lakes.

== Geology ==
Those seven lakes are Begnas, Rupa, Khaste, Depang, Maidi, Neureni and Gunde. Except Begnas and Rupa most of the other lakes are little known to the outsiders.

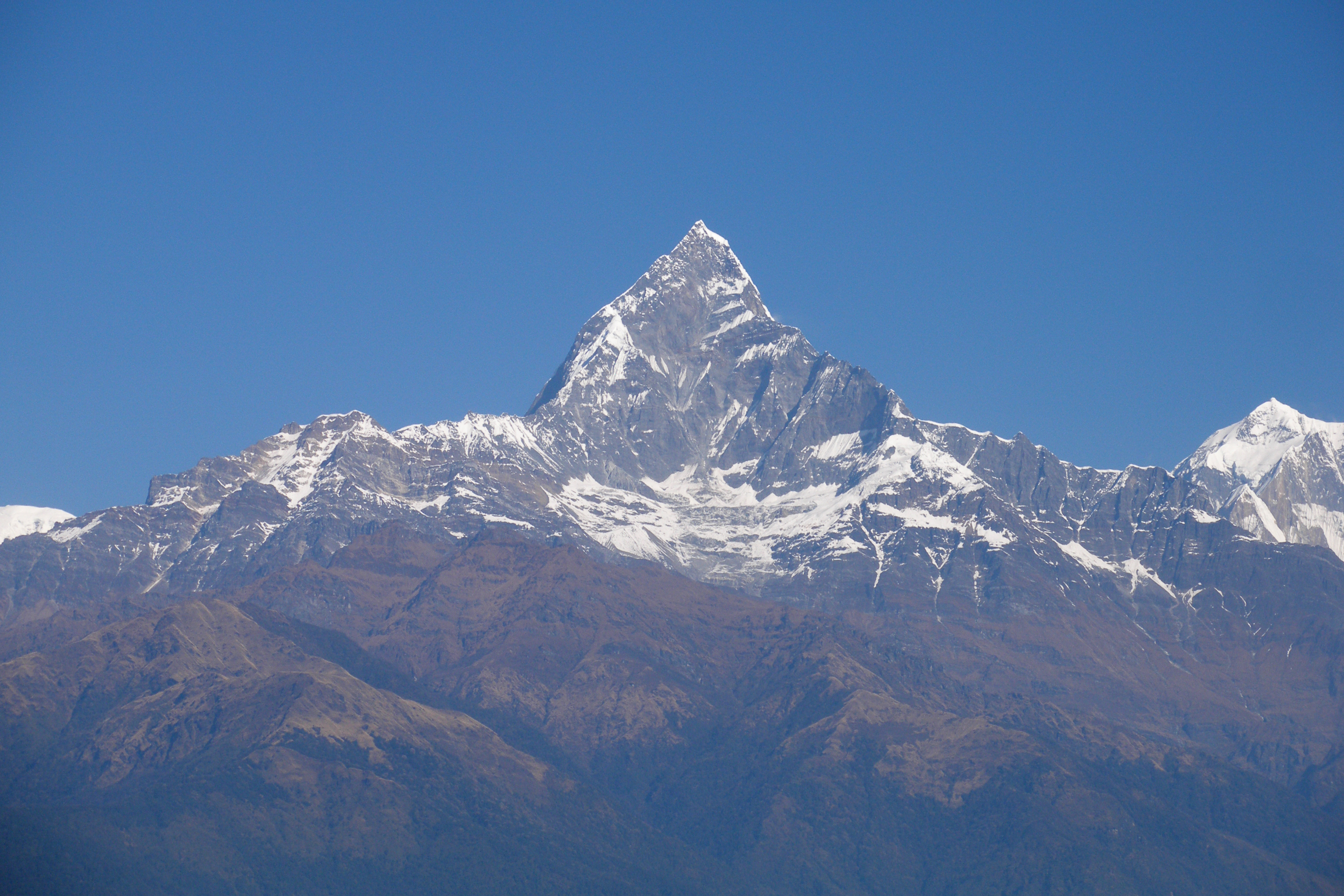
Machapuchare

== Hiking routes ==
Lekhnath features diverse topography and elevated vantage points overlooking multiple lakes and the Annapurna mountain range. The area serves as a hiking destination, offering routes through surrounding hills that provide views of peaks including Machhapuchhre, the Annapurna range, and Dhaulagiri.

Gagangaunda, Shishuwa, Lekhnath chok, Janatako Chautara, Satmuhane, Sajhabazaar, Budhibazar, Dhungepatan, Khodi, Sainik, Talchok are some big and notable places of Lekhnath.

== Media ==
To promote local culture Lekhnath has one FM radio station Radio Lekhnath 106.6 MHz which is a community radio Station. To update Lekhnath dwellers and diasporas websites Cityof7lakes.com, Lekhnathcity.com and Lekhnath.com are created.
