= Hotel association of Nepal =

Hotel Association Nepal
- Type: Non-profit
- Headquarters: Kathmandu
- President: Binayak Shah
- Endowment: (1966)
- Website: www.hotelassociationnepal.org.np

The Hotel association of Nepal (HAN) was established in 1966/67 for the welfare of hotel industry of Nepal. Tourism being a major source of income, HAN has been able to impact the policy of tourism industry of Nepal. The headquarter of the association is located in Gairidhara, Kathmandu.

About NPR 250 billion has been invested in the hotel industry of Nepal providing 50,000 jobs across the country. HAN works to safeguard the interest of hotel entrepreneurs and its employees, thus has a significant impact on the economy of Nepal. It is considered as the first travel trade association of Nepal.

HAN also formulates policies to maintain the standards of hotels running in Nepal.

== History ==
The formal tourist accommodation development in Nepal started with the first five-year development plan in 1956. The first registered hotel, Royal Hotel, was established by a Russian; it had 40 rooms and 50 beds. During the second five-year plan period (1962–66), tourism activities were also expanded to Pokhara and Lumbini. Emphasis was given to the establishment of hotels of international standard in Kathmandu, Pokhara and Biratnagar during the 3rd five-year plan period (1966-1970). At this point, the Hotel Association Nepal was established.

Initially, the association had eight member hotels. Due to government support, in 1970s and the early 80s, HAN was able to project itself as a leader in the governmental decision-making process impacting the tourism industry of Nepal. HAN also networks with national and international association to address the problems faced by the hotel industry.

== Members ==
HAN represents more than 300 hotels including star hotels and normal hotels. The number and type of hotels it represents are shown in the bar-chart below.

- Star hotels
- Tourist Standard Hotel

To conduct vocational training of front office

== Activities ==
- In 2018, it launched a campaign named Campaign to Globalize Nepalese Cuisines to internationalize 25 Nepali food items. It included Kwanti, Sisne jhol, Phando, Jwano ko jhol, Pancha Kwa, Chukur khanda, Karesabari, Chukauni, Timure Aalu, Fulaura, Sekuwa, Sandheko, Tareko, Usineko, Pakku, Chhoyola, Mo:mo, Chatamari, WO, Jogi Bhat, Daal Bhat, Dhindi, Himali, Yomari, Sikarni and Dahiphal

== See also ==
- Tourism in Nepal
- Nepal Tourism Board
- Nepal Mountaineering Association
- Nepal Association of Rafting Agents
