= Bharat Pokhari =

Coordinates: 28°7′N 84°1′E

Bharat Pokhari भरतपोखरी
- Village Development Committee
- Location in Nepal Bharat Pokhari (Nepal)
- Country: Nepal
- Zone: Gandaki Province
- District: Kaski District

Population (1991)
  - Total: 8,889
- Time zone: UTC+5:45 (Nepal Time)

Bharat Pokhari is a town in Kaski District in the Gandaki Province of northern-central Nepal. At the 1991 Nepal census, it had a population of 8,889 persons living in 1782 individual households. Bharat Pokhari was a Village Development Committee, and it was merged with Lekhnath Municipality.

The elevation of Bharat Pokhari ranges from 657m to 1600m.
