= Maidi =

Maidi मैदी
- Village
- Location in Nepal
- Coordinates: 27.90°N 84.79°E
- Country: Nepal
- Zone: Bagmati Zone
- District: Dhading District

Population (1991)
  - Total: 8,496
  - Religions: Hindu
- Time zone: UTC+5:45 (Nepal Time)

Maidi is a village in Dhading District in the Bagmati Zone of central Nepal. At the time of the 1991 Nepal census it had a population of 8496 and had 1627 houses in it.

Formerly, Maidi was a village development committee (VDC), which were local-level administrative units. In 2017, the government of Nepal restructured local government in line with the 2015 constitution and VDCs were discontinued.

== See also ==
- Maidi Lake
