= LA GRANDEE International College =

- Former: Pokhara College of Technology (PCT)
- Established: 2000
- Students: 800
- Location: Pokhara, Kaski, Nepal
- Website: lagrandee.edu.np

LA GRANDEE International College (formerly known as Pokhara College of Technology, or PCT) was established in 2000 as Pokhara's first College for BCA program. Now, the college runs the other programs like BBA and BPH along with BCA.

== Location ==
LA GRANDEE International College is located in Pokhara city of Kaski district.

== Teaching ==
LA GRANDEE International College is a Pokhara University affiliated college. It uses a semester system. All bachelor's degrees are of four years (delivered over eight semesters).

There are four programs:

- Bachelor of Computer Application (BCA)
- Bachelor of Business Administration (BBA)
- Bachelor of Public Health (BPH)
- Post Graduate Diploma in Computer Application (PGDCA)
