= Khaste Lake =

Khaste lake
- खास्टे ताल (Nepali)
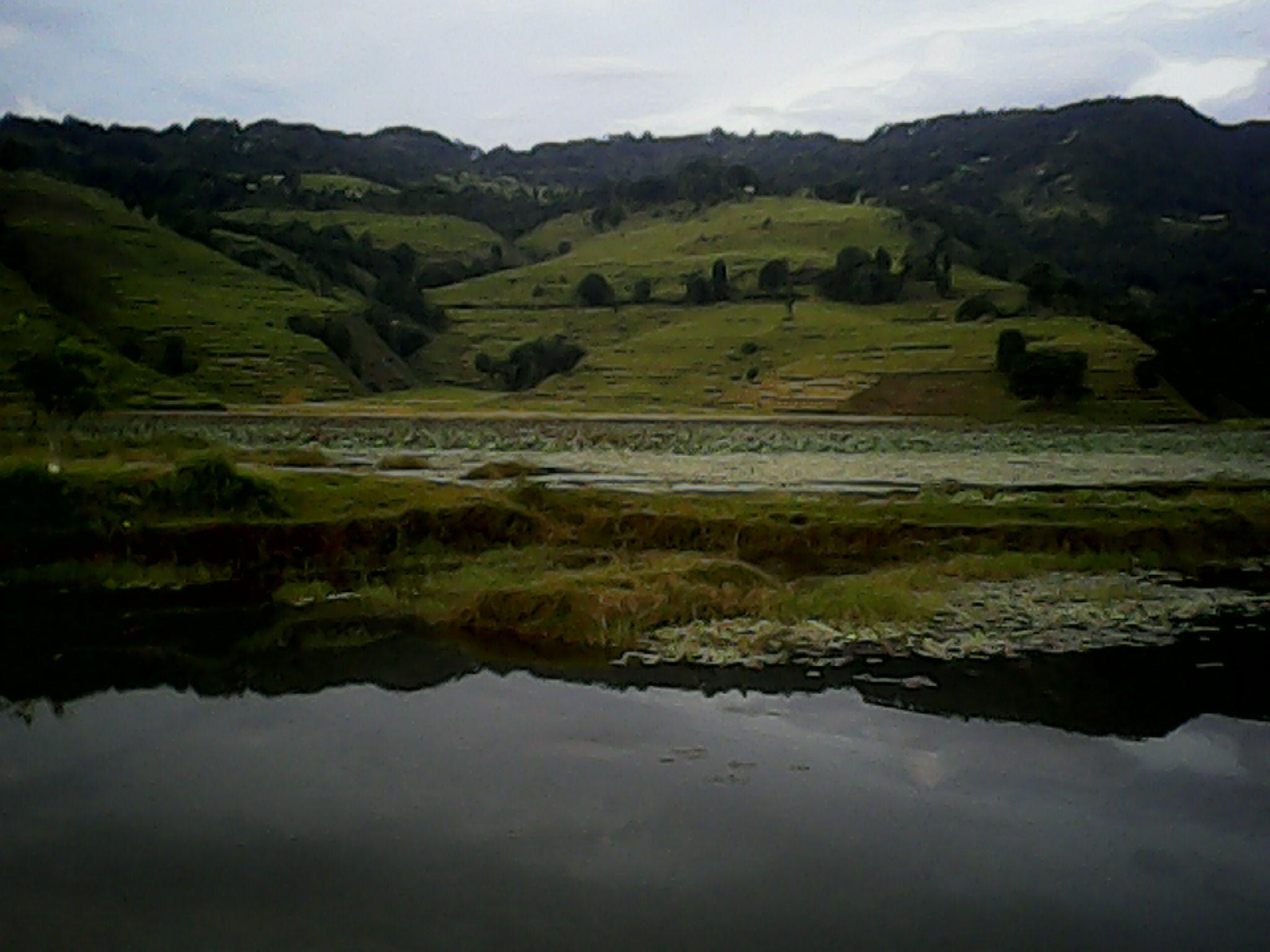
- Khaste lake

- Location within Nepal Location within India
- Location: Lekhnath 3,4,6 Kharane Phant
- Coordinates: 28°11′40″N 84°03′00″E
- Type: lake
- Primary inflows: From Neureni lake
- Primary outflows: Taal khola (ताल खोला)
- Catchment area: 21 ha (0.081 sq mi)
- Basin countries: Nepal
- Surface area: total: 24.8030 hectares (61.290 acres) water: 13.7370 hectares (33.945 acres)
- Settlements: Kharane Phant, Rakhi

Khaste Lake is a freshwater lake located at the Kharane Phant in Pokhara metropolitan city, Nepal. The lake is located in Lekhnath ward numbers 3, 4 and 6.

== Geography ==
Khaste Lake covers an area of 24.8030 hectares (61.290 acres) and the water 's area covers 13.7370 hectares (33.945 acres).

== Fauna ==
Pisciculture has been practiced in this lake for several years.

The area known as Bird Wetland is best suited as a bird watching on the lake. Siberian, Indian and Afghani birds come here to find refuge from the cold.

Yellow bittern, a summer migratory bird species has been observed near the lake.

Area has potential to become research center for migratory birds of different species.
