= BCB 106.6fm =

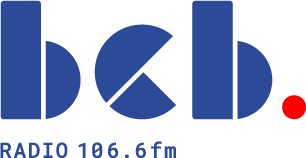
- Bradford, West Yorkshire; England
- Frequency: 106.6 MHz

Programming
- Format: Community radio

Ownership
- Owner: Bradford Community Broadcasting Ltd.

History
- First air date: 1994 (via cable), 2002 (via FM)

Technical information
- Class: Community
- Transmitter coordinates: 53.8330°N 1.7519°W

Links
- Webcast: https://www.bcbradio.co.uk/player/index.html
- Website: www.bcbradio.co.uk

BCB 106.6fm is a radio station licensed to Bradford, West Yorkshire, England, that allows the community to get involved and record and broadcast their own programmes. The station is owned by Bradford Community Broadcasting Ltd. and is regulated by OFCOM. It broadcasts on 106.6 FM to the city of Bradford and online.

Launched on local cable in 1994, the station later became one of fifteen community radio stations in the UK to start broadcasting full-time as part of a one-year trial of community radio. The trials were successful and BCB has subsequently become a full-time community station and has been on air on FM continuously since the start of the original trial broadcast in 2002.

== Programming ==
The days programming is very varied, but a typical day generally offers mostly speech based programmes with music based programmes through the evening and night.

== Awards ==
BCB has received praise by the radio industry and has received very positive feedback including from the local community in Bradford and has been praised for its varied programming, offering people something very different from the BBC and commercial stations in the area, which are not always in tune with local people.

The station received the Radio Academy Regional Station of The Year Award for Yorkshire in 2013.

At the awards ceremony The Chair of Judges said: “Capturing the heartache and joy of life in its area, BCB punches well above its weight with passionate programming that handles its subject matter with respect and integrity. It clearly loves broadcasting to Bradford and delivers a product that the city can be proud of. The station sounded celebratory about the people and place that it serves – exactly how community radio should sound. You can clearly hear how this station has taken the time to genuinely integrate itself within the community. It feels totally at one with its audience.”

== COVID-19 Pandemic ==
Throughout the COVID-19 pandemic BCB has continued to broadcast with the staff and volunteers working hard to continue creating new programmes. There have been some slight changes to the schedule, but still contains plenty of programmes to listen to. It is generally speech based programmes between 09:00 and 20:00 and music based programmes between 20:00 and 09:00.

Some programmes are currently being repeated due to planning and discussion meetings taking place.
