= Khodi, Nepal =

Khodi खुदि
- Rural municipality
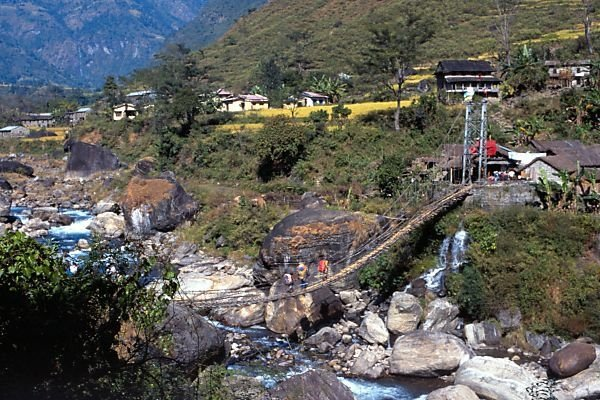

- Location in Nepal Khodi (Nepal)
- Coordinates: 28.40°N 84.31°E
- Country: Nepal
- Zone: Gandaki Zone
- District: Lamjung District

Population (1991)
  - Total: 3,212
- Time zone: UTC+5:45 (Nepal Time)
- Postal Code: 33607
- Area code: 066

Khodi is a rural municipality in Lamjung District in the Gandaki Zone of northern-central Nepal. At the time of the 1991 Nepal census it had a population of 3212 people living in 664 individual households.

== Climate ==
Climate data for Khodi, elevation 823 m (2,700 ft), (1976–2005)
Month	Jan	Feb	Mar	Apr	May	Jun	Jul	Aug	Sep	Oct	Nov	Dec	Year
Mean daily maximum °C (°F)	19.5 (67.1)	21.7 (71.1)	26.2 (79.2)	29.7 (85.5)	30.3 (86.5)	30.6 (87.1)	29.8 (85.6)	30.0 (86.0)	29.2 (84.6)	27.4 (81.3)	24.6 (76.3)	20.7 (69.3)	26.6 (80.0)
Mean daily minimum °C (°F)	6.6 (43.9)	8.7 (47.7)	12.5 (54.5)	15.8 (60.4)	18.1 (64.6)	20.3 (68.5)	21.0 (69.8)	21.0 (69.8)	19.5 (67.1)	15.2 (59.4)	11.2 (52.2)	7.5 (45.5)	14.8 (58.6)
Average precipitation mm (inches)	28.4 (1.12)	46.7 (1.84)	79.7 (3.14)	103.7 (4.08)	232.3 (9.15)	538.7 (21.21)	867.6 (34.16)	838.4 (33.01)	490.5 (19.31)	94.6 (3.72)	18.5 (0.73)	23.2 (0.91)	3,367.1 (132.56)
Source: Agricultural Extension in South Asia
