= Gude Lake =

Lake in Nepal

- Location within Nepal
- Location: Lekhnath municipality, Kaski, Nepal
- Coordinates: 28°11′29.5″N 84°02′29.6″E

Gude Lake

Gude Lake is a freshwater lake located in Lekhnath municipality of Kaski, Nepal. It is located to the northeast side of Budhibazar. It is named so after the high presence of a hydrophyte called Gude in Nepali. The lake consists of grasses and aquatic flowering plants. The lake is usually taken care by the local clubs there for cleaning and other management works namely, the Peace Loving Mothers' Club, whose present head is Mira Bhandari. The lake is quite small in area. There is a damside way constructed beside the lake which separates it from the cultivable fields on the other side.
