= Tourism in Nepal =

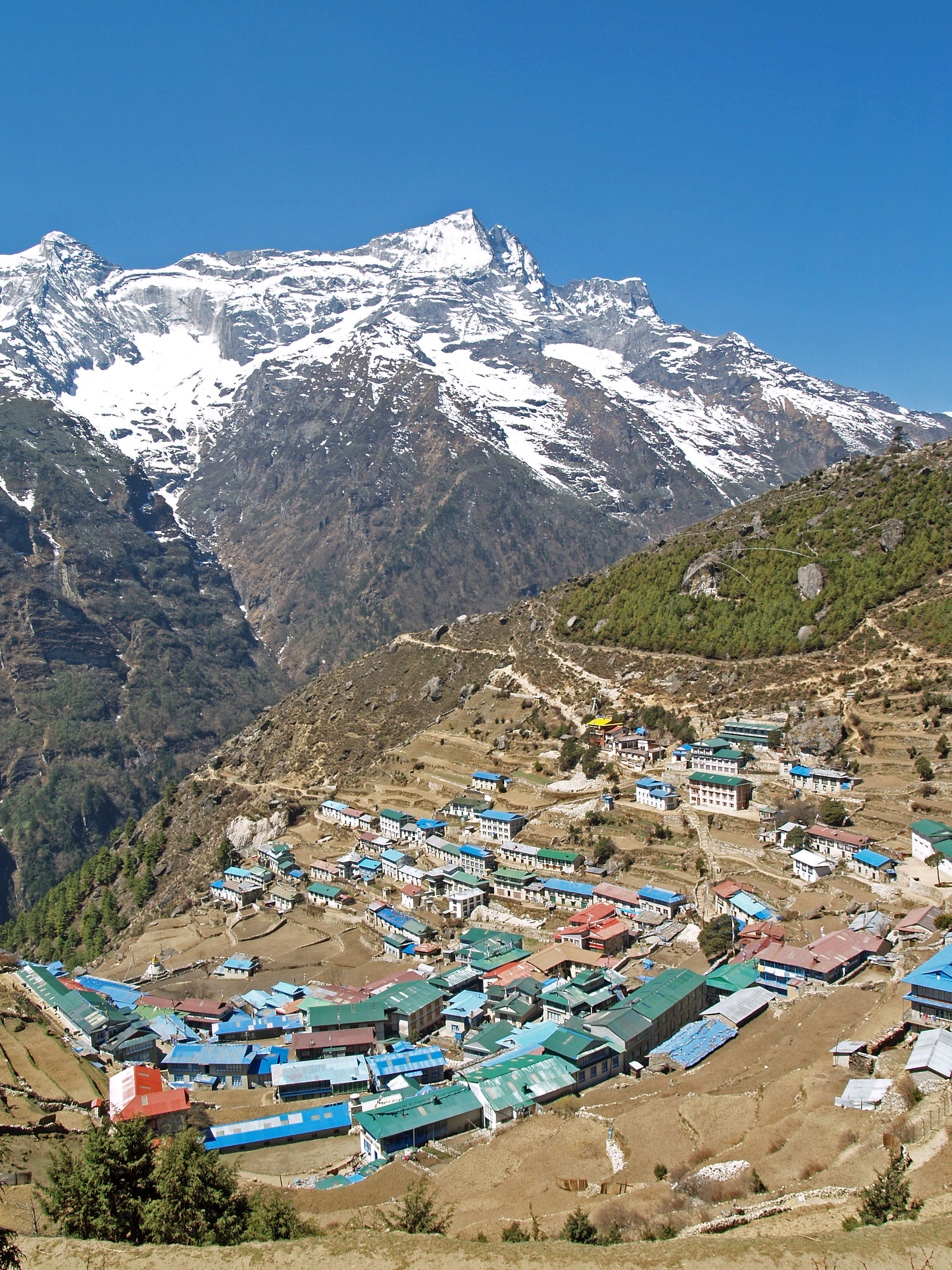
Namche Bazaar, gateway to Mount Everest, under snow

Tourism is the largest source of foreign exchange revenue for Nepal. Tourism in Nepal contributes about 6.7% of the country's gross domestic product (GDP). In 2025, Nepal welcomed 11,58,4589 tourists, placing it 147th globally in terms of tourist numbers. Home to eight of the ten highest mountains in the world, Nepal is a destination for mountaineers, rock climbers and adventure seekers. The Hindu and Buddhist heritages of Nepal are also strong attractions.

== Overview ==
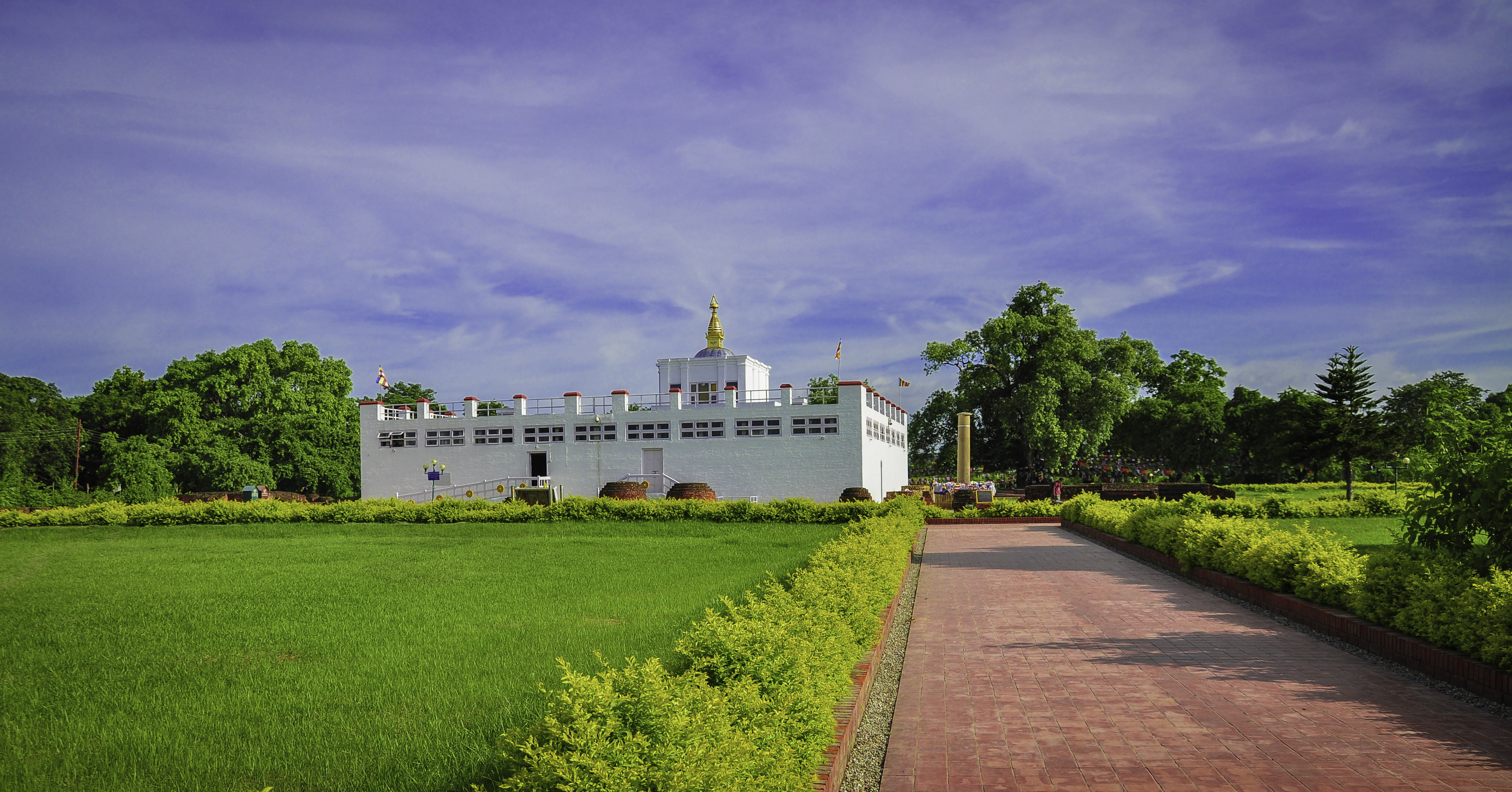
Mayadevi Temple marking the Buddha's birthplace in Lumbini

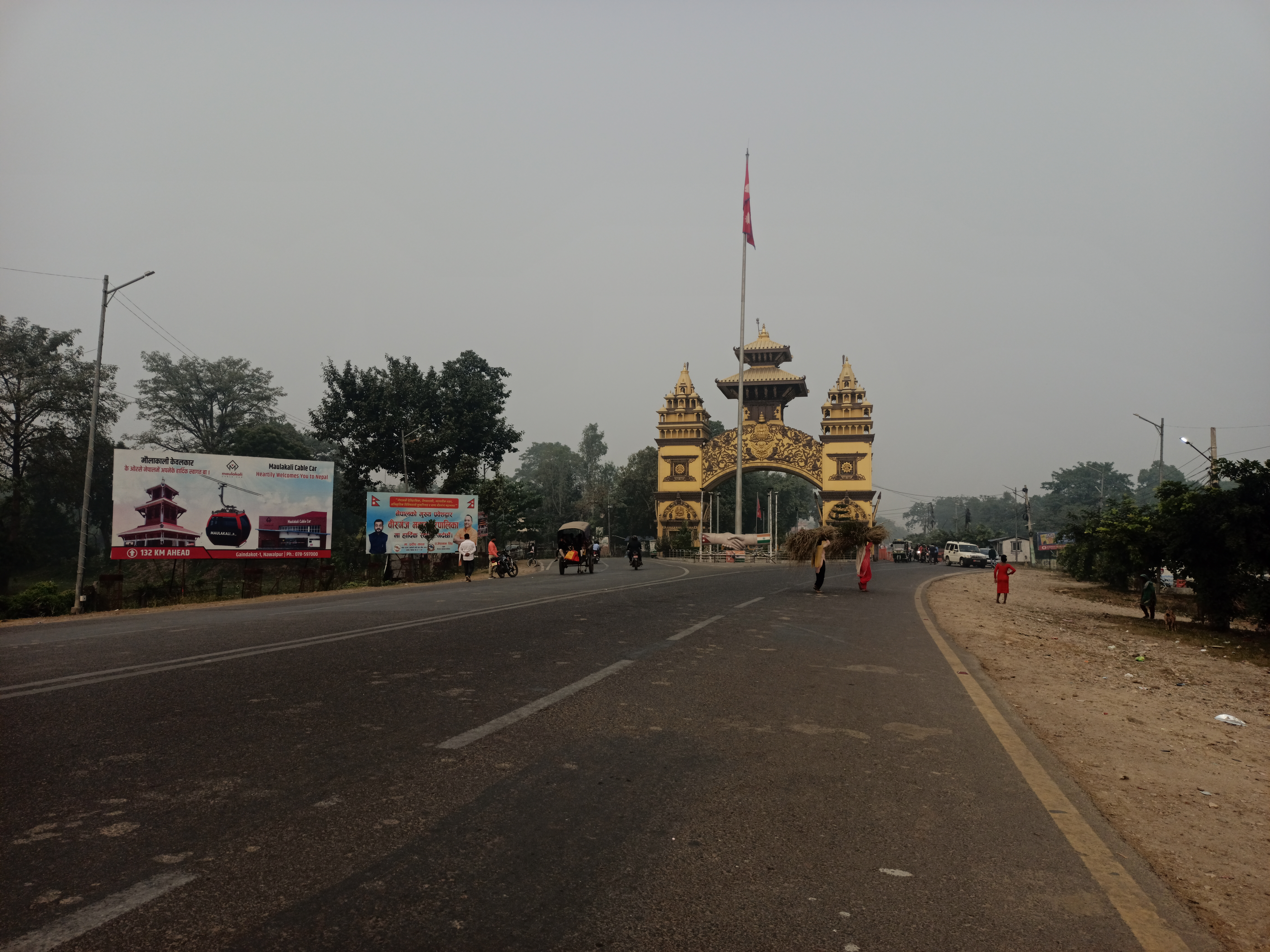
Shankharacharya Gate in Birgunj, is main entry Point of Nepal from north Bihar, India (also known as the Gateway of Nepal).

Mount Everest, the highest mountain peak in the world (8,848.86m above the sea level), is located in Nepal. Mountaineering and other types of adventure tourism and ecotourism are important attractions for visitors. The World Heritage Site Lumbini, the birthplace of Buddha, and other important religious pilgrimage sites are located throughout the country. The tourist industry is seen as a way to alleviate poverty and achieve greater social equity in the country. Tourism brings $471 million a year to Nepal.

According to statistics of 2025, there was a growth rate of 2.1%. According to statistics from Nepal Tourism Board (NTB), a total of 1,197,191 foreign tourists entered the country in 2019 as compared to 1,173,072 in 2018. The government of Nepal declared 2011 to be Nepal Tourism Year, and hoped to attract one million foreign tourists to the country during that year. The government of Nepal has also declared Lumbini Tourism Year 2012 to promote Lumbini. The government of Nepal has also recently declared Visit Nepal 2020 with the aim of bringing in two million tourists by 2020.

Most of tourists visit for short stays. In 2022, 64.7% of the tourists came to Nepal for holiday vacations,10.03% came for adventure, such as trekking and mountaineering, 12.87% came for religious visits, and 12.39% for other reasons. Tourists who come from the USA, UK, France, Spain, India, and Germany have a main target of activity: mountain climbing. Mt. Everest, Mt. Ama Dablam, and Mt. Manaslu are the most popular mountains.

The tourism industry of Nepal was affected after the destructive earthquake in 2015, by the series of earthquakes in 2015. In 2020, the tourism sector in Nepal collapsed due to the COVID-19 pandemic.

In 2022, tourism income increased by 190% from 2021. The gross foreign exchange earnings were Nrs 46,756,824 thousand (Around 326,282 thousand US$).

== Religious sites ==
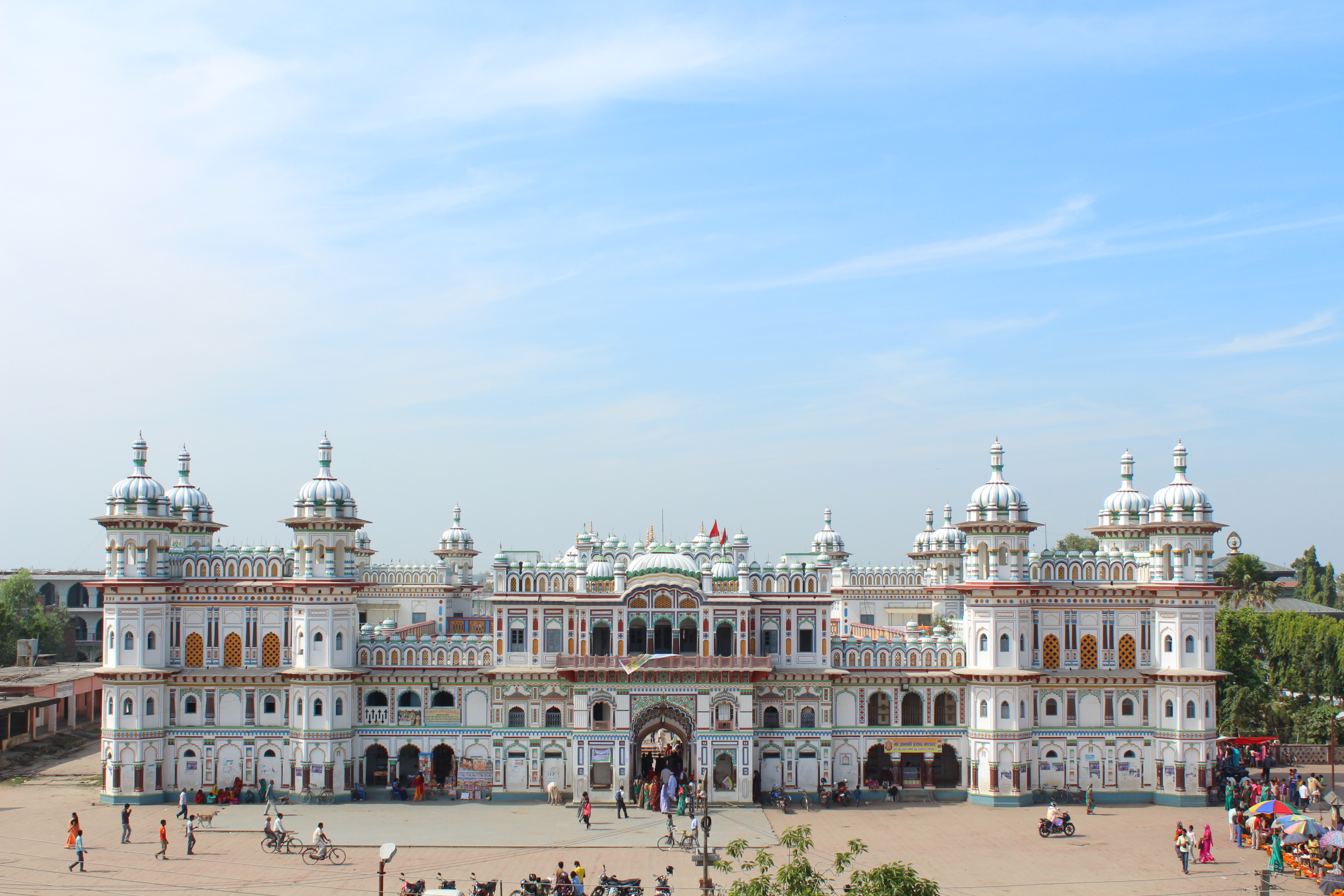
Janaki Mandir in Janakpur, the temple where the Hindu goddess Sita married Lord Rama in Nepal.

The most followed religion in Nepal is Hinduism, and the Pashupatinath Temple, the world's largest temple of Lord Shiva, located in Kathmandu, attracts many pilgrims and tourists. This is arguably the most famous Hindu temple in the Indian Subcontinent. Adjacent to the temple, lies a crematorium where bodies are burned to ashes. Pashupatinath is also listed in UNESCO heritage sites. Other Hindu pilgrimage sites include the temple complex in Swargadwari in the Pyuthan district; Janaki Mandir in Janakpurdham in Mithila region; Lake Gosainkunda near Dhunche; the temples at Devghat; Kalinchowk Bhagwati Temple in Dolakha; Manakamana temple in the Gorkha District; Pathibhara near Phungling; Galeshwordham Myagdi and Mahamrityunjaya Shivasan Nepal in Palpa District where the biggest metallic idol of Lord Shiva is located.

Kailashnath Mahadev Statue at Nasiksthan Sanga in the Kathmandu Valley is a prominent religious landmark dedicated to Shiva. The statue is located along the Araniko Highway and attracts Hindu pilgrims and visitors. The site is associated with the wider religious and tourism activities of the Sanga area.

Buddhism is the second largest followed religion in context of Nepal. The World Heritage Site at Lumbini, which is considered to be the birthplace of Gautama Buddha, is an important pilgrimage site. Another prominent Buddhist site is Swayambhunath, the Monkey Temple, in Kathmandu.

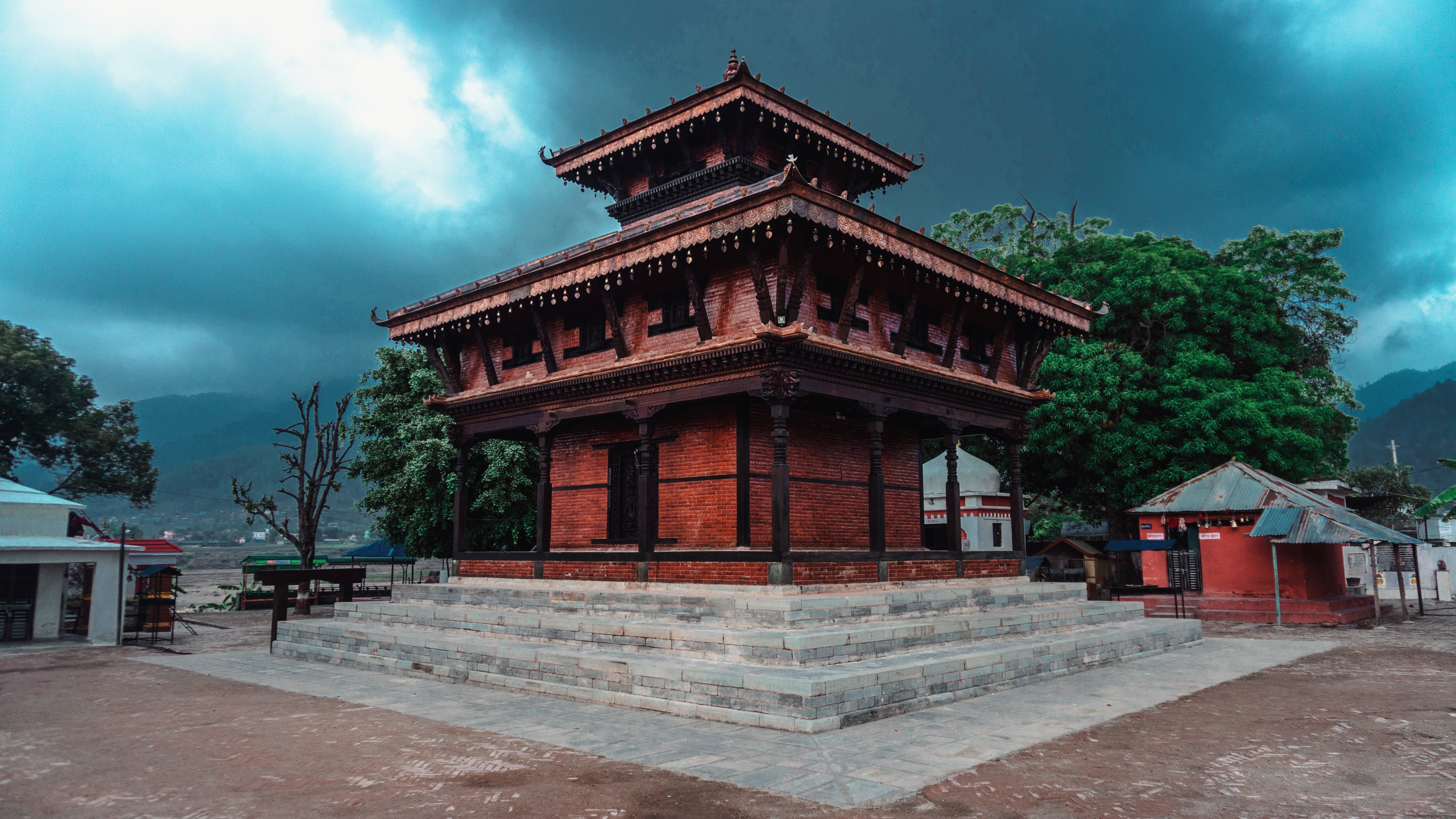
Ambikeshwori Temple, Dang is a Shakta pitha which is supposed to have emerged due to the falling of right ear of Satidevi according to the Swasthani Purana.

Dang valley is a sacred place for Hindus as well as other religions. Kalika and Malika Devi in Chillikot hill, Ambekeshawori temple, Krishna temple, Dharapani temple are among the sacred places in Dang district. Chillikot hill is also a good place for sightseeing and also an ancient palace of a king.

Muktinath is a sacred place for Hindus as well as Buddhists. The site is located in Muktinath Valley, Mustang district.

Badimalika temple in Bajura District, Gadhimai Temple in Bara district, Halesi-Maratika Caves in Khotang. Bhageshwori Mandir in Nepalgunj.

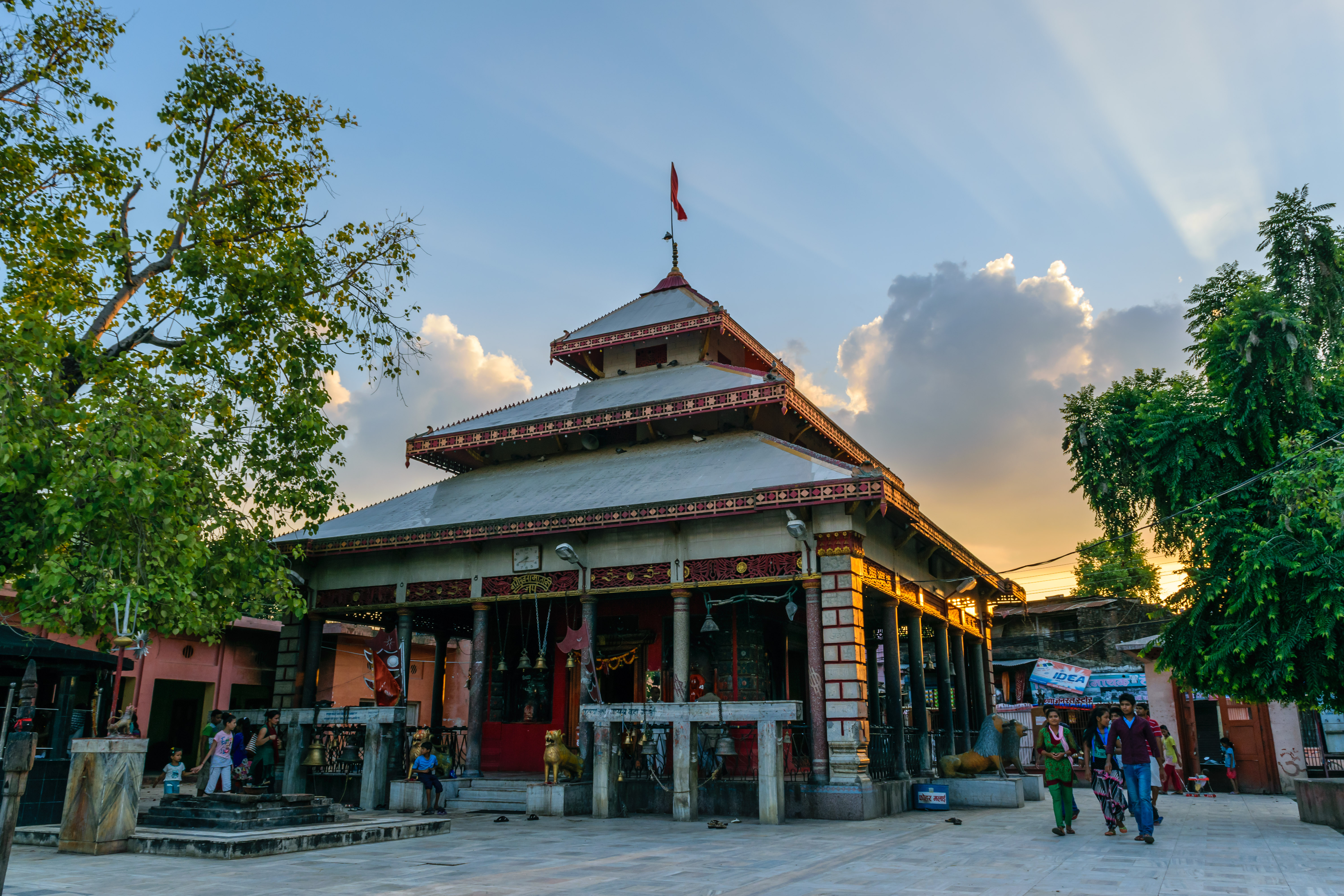
Side view of the Bhageshwori Mandir

Bhagwati Temple in Rajbiraj are also some popular temples in Nepal.

== World Heritage Sites ==
Location of World Heritage Sites in Nepal

Nepal ratified the convention on 20 June 1978, making its historical sites eligible for inclusion on the list. Four sites in Nepal were on the list in 2023, with a further fifteen on the tentative list, of sites that may be considered for future submission. The first sites in Nepal to be added to the list were the Sagarmatha National Park and the Kathmandu Valley, added in 1979. Due to the partial or substantial loss of the traditional elements of six out of seven monument zones and resulting general loss of authenticity and integrity of the whole property, Kathmandu Valley was also added to the List of World Heritage in Danger between 2003 and 2007. Chitwan National Park was listed in 1984, and Lumbini, the birthplace of Buddha according to Buddhist tradition, was added in 1997. The National Parks are natural sites, and the other two are cultural.

Nepal has several UNESCO World Heritage Sites that showcase the country's culture and natural beauty. Among the well-known heritage sites are the historic temples of Kathmandu Valley, Lumbini, where Buddha was born, and Chitwan National Park. These sites tell of Nepal's history, religious beliefs, the beauty of its architecture, and the variety of wildlife.

World Heritage Sites in Nepal

UNESCO lists sites under ten criteria; each entry must meet at least one of the criteria. Criteria i through vi are cultural, and vii through x are natural.

* Trans-border site

Site	Image	Location	Year listed	UNESCO data	Description
Sagarmatha National Park	A village in a large mountain valley. In the distance very high snow-covered mountains are visible.	Solukhumbu District	1979	120; vii (natural)	Sagarmatha National Park encompasses the mountains of the Great Himalayan Range which includes the Earth's highest mountain above sea level, Mount Everest (known in Nepal as Sagarmatha), and the Sacred Himalayan Landscape, the transboundary landscape in the eastern Himalayas. The park covers an area of 124,400 hectares (307,000 acres) of land and 20 villages with 6000 Sherpas who have lived in the area for the last four centuries.
Kathmandu Valley		Kathmandu Valley	1979	121; iii, iv, vi (cultural)	The World Heritage Site comprises seven properties: Bhaktapur Durbar Square, Boudhanath, Changu Narayan Temple, Kathmandu Durbar Square, Pashupatinath Temple, Patan Durbar Square, and Swayambhunath (pictured). Three royal Durbar Squares were used by the Mallas, after the unification of Nepal they were used by the Shahs, and the Ranas. Two stupas: Swayambhunath is the oldest and Boudhanath is the largest in Nepal. Changu Narayan Temple is the oldest Hindu temple in Nepal dating back to the fifth century AD, and Pashupatinath Temple is the largest temple complex in Nepal. Kathmandu Valley was listed as endangered from 2003 to 2007 due to the partial or substantial loss of the traditional elements of six out of seven monument zones and resulting in a general loss of authenticity and integrity of the whole property.
Chitwan National Park	A lake with tree trunks in the water.	Chitwan District, Nawalpur District, Parasi District, Parsa District, and Makwanpur District	1984	284; vii, ix, x (natural)	Chitwan National Park, part of the subtropical Inner Terai lowlands of south-central Nepal, is home to one of the last populations of Indian rhinoceros and the Bengal tiger. Historically used by the feudal big game hunters and their entourage, where they stayed for a couple of months shooting hundreds of tigers, rhinoceroses, elephants, leopards, and sloth bears. The park is now one of the last remaining ecosystems of the Tarai region and it is home to over 68 mammal species.
Lumbini, the Birthplace of the Lord Buddha	A large tree next to a water filled pool.	Rupandehi District	1997	666; iii, vi (cultural)	Lumbini, where the founder of the world religion of Buddhism, Gautama Buddha, was born in 623 BC. Lumbini is regarded as one of the holiest places in Buddhism and it features pilgrimage sites dating back to the 3rd century BC. The complex includes the Lumbini pillar inscription, Maya Devi Temple, and Shakya Tank where Maya bathed before giving birth to Buddha.

Tentative list of World Heritage Sites in Nepal

In addition to the sites inscribed on the World Heritage List, member states can maintain a list of tentative sites that they may consider for nomination. Nominations for the World Heritage List are only accepted if the site was previously listed on the tentative list. As of 2019, Nepal recorded 15 sites on its tentative list.

Tentative sites
Site	Image	Location	Year listed	UNESCO criteria	Description
The early medieval architectural complex of Panauti		Kavrepalanchok District	1996	Cultural	Panauti, located at the confluence of two sacred rivers Roshi River and Punyamati River, is home to numerous heritage structures. Both Hindus and Buddhists consider Panauti to be a sacred town, and it contains numerous architectural complexes including the Indresvar Mahadev Temple and the Brahmayani Temple. Yomari, a popular delicacy in Nepal, originated from Panauti.
Tilaurakot, the archaeological remains of ancient Shakya Kingdom		Kapilvastu District	1996	Cultural	Tilaurakot is believed to be the cardinal point of the ancient Shakya city of Kapilavastu, where Gautama Buddha spent 29 years of his life. He left his palace at Kapilavastu to live a life as an ascetic to reach enlightenment. Tilaurakot is also a holy site for Hindus and there are numerous temples on the site.
Cave architecture of Muktinath Valley of Mustang		Mustang District	1996	Cultural	Sky Caves of Mustang were originally used as burial chambers, the caves eventually became meditation chambers, military lookouts, or storage units as part of the Kingdom of Lo. There are roughly around 10,000 man-made caves dug into the sides of valleys, some of which are estimated to be thousands of years old.
The medieval palace complex of Gorkha		Gorkha District	1996	Cultural	Gorkha Palace complex is a 16th-century palace built by the King of Gorkha, Ram Shah. Built in traditional Nepalese architecture, It served as a fort, a palace, and a temple. Prithvi Narayan Shah was crowned as the King of Gorkha in the palace, who would later be crowned the first King of a unified Nepal. Gorkha Palace was severely damaged by the April 2015 Nepal earthquake.
Ramagrama, the relic stupa of Lord Buddha		Parasi District	1996	Cultural	The site includes the only undisturbed original stupa containing relics of Buddha. According to the legends, Mauryan emperor, Ashoka, visited the Ramagrama in 249 BC, however, when he tried to open the stupa, a snake god appeared and told him not to open it, subsequently, he left it alone. Currently, there are no plans to open the stupa, and the site only features a grassy mound.
Khokana, the vernacular village and its mustard-oil seed industrial heritage		Lalitpur District	1996	Cultural	Khokana is described being a "living museum" as includes a system of drainage and chowks, traditional houses, chaityas, a mother deity temple, and its mustard fields and processing sites. Home to the indigenous Newar people, governed as part of the Lalitpur metropolitan city, and Khokana has some surviving works from the Kirata-era. Today, it is known for producing mustard oil.
Medieval Earthen Walled City of Lo Manthang		Mustang District	2008	Cultural	Lo Manthang was established as the capital of the Kingdom of Lo in the 14th century. Situated 3800 meters above sea level, it was once the hub of the ancient Tibet–Nepal salt trade route. Even though Nepal was opened to the outside world in the 1950s, Upper Mustang was restricted to foreigners until 1992 and currently, there is a limit on how many tourists are allowed to visit. Due to its isolation, the city has preserved its way of life.
Vajrayogini and early settlement of Sankhu		Kathmandu District	2008	Cultural	The site includes the Lichchhavi period (2nd to 9th century AD) settlement of Sankhu and the Vajrayogini temple complex constructed in the mid 17th century.
Medieval Settlement of Kirtipur		Kathmandu District	2008	Cultural	The site includes the Newar monuments of Chilancho Vihar, Jagat Pal Vihar, Buddha Dharma Sangha Shikhara, Baghbhairab Temple, Vath (Layaku), Umamaheshvar Temple, Indrayani Pith, Chitu Bahail, Lokeshwar Shikhara, Buddha Temple, Chve Bahal and Kwe Bahal.
Rishikesh Complex of Ruru Kshetra		Palpa District	2008	Cultural	The site includes an ancient route and cremation site between Muktinath and Damodar Kunda, the settlement of Ridi, and the entire complex.
Nuwakot Palace Complex		Nuwakot District	2008	Cultural	The site includes Nuwakot Palace and various temples and shrines, such as Bhairab Temple.
Ram Janaki Temple		Dhanusa District	2008	Cultural	The site is composed of classical and neo-classical designs with elements of fortification.
The Medieval Town of Tansen		Palpa District	2008	Cultural	The site includes Bhairab Temple, the Purankot Durbar, the Srinagar Durbar (Fort), the Bansha Gopal, the Mukundeshwar Mahadev, the Amar Narayan Temple, the Ran-Ujjeshwari Bhagawati Temple and the Tansen Durbar.
Sinja Valley		Jumla District	2008	Cultural	The site includes the capital of the Khasas kingdom from the 12th to 14th centuries.
Bhurti Temple Complex of Dailekh		Dailekh District	2008	Cultural	The site includes 22 monuments constructed through the Western Malla architectural style.

== Wilderness tourism ==
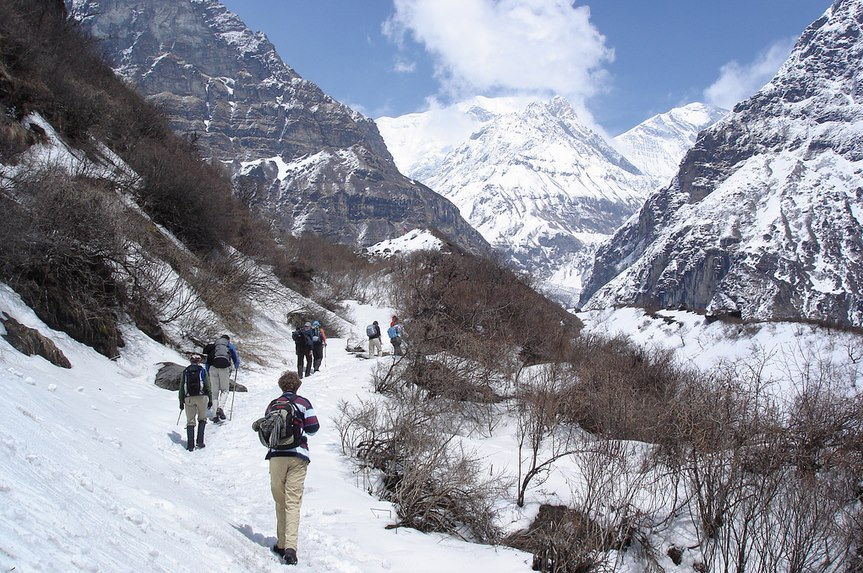
Tourists trekking in Annapurna region in western Nepal

According to Nepal's Ministry of Tourism, major tourist activities include wilderness and adventure activities such as mountain biking, bungee jumping, rock climbing and mountain climbing, trekking, hiking, bird watching, flights, paragliding and hot air ballooning over the mountains of Himalaya, exploring the waterways by raft, kayak or canoe and jungle safaris especially in the Terai region. International elephant polo is played at Chitwan National Park.

== Orphanage tourism ==
In 2018, research into global volunteering behaviour identified Nepal as one of the world’s ten most popular destinations for orphanage voluntourism.

Leading responsible tourism and child welfare organisations agree that it is irresponsible for short term and/or untrained international volunteers to work in orphanages. Few volunteers are qualified to interact with traumatised, vulnerable children and many orphanages lack the facilities, trained staff, and child protection policies to create safe, nurturing environments for children in care.

There are over 800 orphanages in Nepal, with 80% of those in tourist areas. Out of the 75 districts in the country, most registered orphanages and children’s homes are found in the five most-visited by tourists (Kathmandu, Lalitpur, Bhaktapur, Kaski, and Chitwan).

Orphanages attract tourists who want to volunteer their time and donate money, unaware that they are supporting an industry taking advantage of impoverished families.

In Nepal, there are an estimated 16,886 children living in orphanages, 80% of whom have at least one parent who could care for them. With promises of an education and a better life, children are recruited into orphanages from rural areas which are still suffering from the economic effects of ten years of civil war, to meet demands for donations – a phenomenon known as orphanage trafficking.

The ChildSafe Movement reports instances of orphanages keeping children in impoverished conditions to attract more donors. ECPAT has also identified a link between orphanage tourism, and an increase in child sexual exploitation by foreigners and volunteers.

== Statistics ==
Yearly tourist arrivals in thousands

In 2007, the number of international tourists visiting Nepal was 526,705, which was an increase of 37.2% compared to the previous year. In 2008, the number of tourists decreased by 5% to 500,277. In 2018, the number of international tourists arrival was 1.17 million. In 2019, the number increased to 1.19 million. In 2020, the COVID-19 pandemic had a major impact on tourism in Nepal, with tourist arrivals dropping to just 230,085 with a decrease of over 80.7% and further decrease by 30% in 2021 with a total number of 150,962. Pokhara is one of the main tourist destinations in Nepal.

In 2008, 55.9% of the foreign visitors came from Asia (18.2% from India), while Western Europeans accounted for 27.5%, 7.6% were from North America, 3.2% from Australia and the Pacific Region, 2.6% from Eastern Europe, 1.5% from Central and South America, 0.3% from Africa and 1.4% from other countries.

Foreign tourists visiting Nepal in 2008 stayed in the country for an average of 11.78 days which has now increased to 15.1 days and 15.5 days in 2020 and 2021 respectively

In 2024, Nepal received 1,147,567 foreign tourists, a 13.1% increase over 2023 and about 96% of pre-pandemic levels, according to the Nepal Tourism Board.

=== Arrivals ===
This statistic shows the number of international tourist arrivals by year:

View source data.

Year	Tourist Arrivals	% Change
2025	1,158,459	▲1.00%
2024	1,147,548	▲13.02%
2023	1,014,885	▲65.1%
2022	614,869	▲307.3%
2021	150,962	▼34.3%
2020	230,085	▼80.7%
2019	1,197,191	▲2.1%
2018	1,173,072	▲24.8%
2017	940,218	▲24.8%
2016	753,002	▲40%
2015	538,970	▼31%
2014	790,118	▼0.9%
2013	797,616	▼0.7%
2012	803,092	▲9.1%
2011	736,215	▲22.1%
2010	602,867	▲18.2%
2009	509,956	▲1.9%
2008	500,277	▼5.0%
2007	526,705	▲37.3%
2006	383,926	▲2.3%
2005	375,398	▼2.6%
2004	385,297	▲13.9%
2003	338,132	▲22.7%
2002	275,468	▼23.7%
2001	361,237	▼22.1%
2000	463,646	▼5.7%
1999	491,504	▲6.0%
1998	463,684	▲9.9%
1997	421,857	▲7.2%
1996	393,613	▲8.3%
1995	363,395	▲11.3%
1994	326,531	▲11.2%
1993	293,567	▼12.2%

Nepal received 614,869 and 1,014,885 tourists in 2022 and 2023, respectively, according to the Department of Immigration. Nepal's ranking of tourism in year 2022 was 81st, and 147th by 2023 placing it globally in terms of tourist numbers. Currently, Nepal is ranked 105th in the latest Travel & Tourism Development Index 2024 published by World Economic Forum.

=== Arrivals by country ===
Most tourists arriving to Nepal on short-term basis were from the following countries of nationality:

Country	2018	2017	2016	2015	2014	2013	2012
India	254,150	194,323	160,832	118,249	75,124	135,343	180,974
China	169,543	153,633	104,664	104,005	66,984	123,805	113,173
United States	93,218	91,895	79,146	53,645	42,687	49,830	47,355
United Kingdom	61,144	63,466	51,058	46,295	29,730	36,759	35,688
Sri Lanka	55,869	69,490	45,361	57,521	44,367	37,546	32,736
Thailand	41,653	52,429	39,154	26,722	32,338	33,422	40,969
South Korea	29,680	37,218	34,301	25,171	18,112	23,205	19,714
Australia	38,972	38,429	33,371	25,507	16,619	24,516	20,469
Myanmar	36,274	41,402	30,852	25,769	21,631	—N/a	—N/a
Germany	36,641	36,879	29,918	23,812	16,405	18,028	22,263
Bangladesh	25,849	26,355	29,060	23,440	14,831	21,851	22,410
Japan	30,534	29,817	27,326	22,979	17,613	25,892	26,694
France	30,646	31,810	26,140	20,863	16,405	24,097	21,842
Malaysia	21,329	22,833	18,284	13,669	9,855	18,915	18,842
Spain	19,057	20,214	15,953	12,255	6,741	13,110	10,412
Canada	17,102	17,317	15,105	12,491	8,398	11,610	12,132
Netherlands	15,032	15,353	13,393	11,453	7,515	12,320	10,516
Total Foreigner	1,197,191	1,173,072	753,918	753,002	538,970	790,118	797,616

== See also ==
- Visa policy of Nepal
