= Nepal Tourism Board =

Government agency of Nepal

Agency overview
- Formed: December 31, 1998
- Jurisdiction: Nepal
- Headquarters: Bhrikutimandap, Kathmandu, Nepal
- Minister responsible: Ministry of Culture, Tourism and Civil Aviation
- Agency executives: Hikmat Singh Ayer, Officiating Chief Executive Officer; Santosh Panta
- Website: ntb.gov.np photonepal.org

The Nepal Tourism Board (NTB) is the official national tourism organization of Nepal. It is focused on promoting Nepal as a tourist destination in domestic and international markets and for supporting tourism development.

The Board chaired by the Secretary at the Ministry of Tourism and Civil Aviation consists of 11 board members with five government representatives, five private sector representatives and the chief executive officer. The current Officiating CEO of Nepal Tourism Board is Hikmat Singh Ayer succeeding Deepak Raj Joshi.

== History ==
Nepal Tourism Board is a national organization established in 1998 by an act of Parliament in the form of partnership between the Government of Nepal and private sector tourism industry to develop and market Nepal as an attractive tourist destination. Therefore, making it a pioneer organization made using the PPP model (Public, Private, Partnership).

== Tourism Brand ==
"Nepal: Lifetime Experiences" is the slogan of the tourism board. The phrase aims at the redefining the scope of international tourism in Nepal, as a destination for unique and unmatched experience for tourists who visit the country as a holiday destination.

== #photoNepal ==
photoNepal is a visual documentation initiative of the Nepal Tourism Board that collects and curates photographs/videos representing Nepal's natural, cultural, and social contexts. Developed as part of the board's communication activities, it involves contributions from both professional photographers and the general public. The initiative focuses on building a digital archive through open submissions, thematic campaigns, and curated showcases, including exhibitions and online dissemination. It contributes to the availability of visual records of Nepal and provides material used in tourism-related communication while reflecting a range of geographic locations and community perspectives.

The #photoNepal exhibition was inaugurated on February 5, 2016, with the photo exhibition of Dr.Toni Hagan, the first foreigner to trek throughout Nepal during geological survey work. 54 photographs taken by Toni Hagan were exhibited. Different national and international photographers work on Nepal has been exhibited in #photoNepal series.

In 2019, NTB launched the PhotoNepal digital platform to crowdsource and archive tourism photographs for promotional use. The initiative also organizes exhibitions and photography contests.

== See also ==
- Hotel association of Nepal
- Trekking Agencies Association of Nepal
- Nepal Mountaineering Association
- List of world records from Nepal

photonepal.org
