= Dipang Lake =

Dipang lake
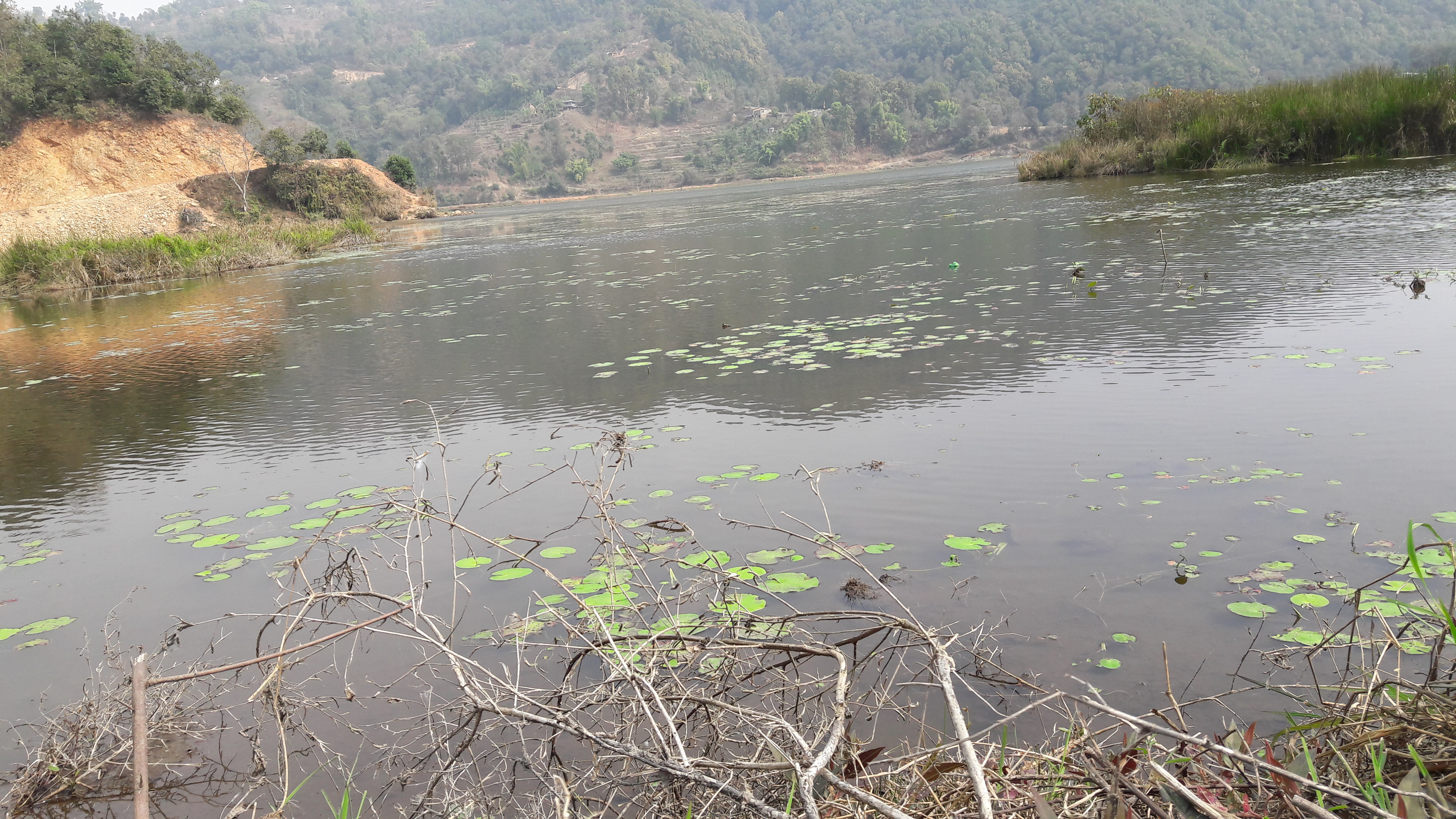

- Location within Nepal
- Location: Lekhnath, Kaski District, Nepal
- Coordinates: 28.180°N 84.069°E
- Type: lake

Dipang Lake is a freshwater lake located in the Lekhnath municipality of Kaski, Nepal.

It is the fourth-largest lake among the seven lakes of Lekhnath to be listed in the wetland list of the world. It is famous as a picnic spot from where Himalayas and green hills can be seen. It is also known for wild lotus and swan.
