= Radio Lekhnath =

Lekhnath, Nepal; Nepal
- Frequency: 106.6 MHz

Radio Lekhnath is a radio station in Lekhnath, Nepal, which transmits on 106.6 MHz. The station produces various programmes related to current affairs, news, education, social, cultural and environmental awareness.
