= Rupa Lake =

Freshwater lake in Nepal

- Rupa Tal
- रुपा ताल (Nepali)
- View of Rupa lake and Paddy fields.

- Location within Nepal
- Location: Kaski
- Coordinates: 28°8′55″N 84°6′40″E
- Lake type: Freshwater
- Primary inflows: Talbesi stream & Dhovan khola
- Primary outflows: Tal Khola
- Catchment area: 30 km^{2} (12 sq mi)
- Basin countries: Nepal
- Surface area: 1.35 km^{2} (0.5 sq mi)
- Average depth: 3 m (10 ft)
- Max. depth: 6 m (20 ft)
- Water volume: 0.00325 km^{3} (0.00078 cu mi)
- Surface elevation: 600 m (2,000 ft)
- Settlements: Lekhnath

Rupa Lake or Rupa Tal is a freshwater lake in Nepal located in the border of Pokhara Metropolitan and Rupa Rural Municipality of Kaski District. It is the third biggest lake in Pokhara valley of Nepal and at an altitude of 600 m (1,969 ft) covering area about 1.35 km^{2} (0.5 sq mi) with an average water depth 3 m (9.8 ft) and maximum depth 6 m (20 ft). The lake is elongated north to south and is fed by perennial streams. Its watershed area is 30 km^{2}, where The main inflow of water is from Talbesi stream, whereas Dhovan khola is the feeder stream with its outlet Tal khola at Sistani ghat. It supports a number of floral and faunal species. A total of 36 species of waterbirds have been recorded in the lake which represents about 19 percent of the total 193 wetland-dependent birds found in Nepal.

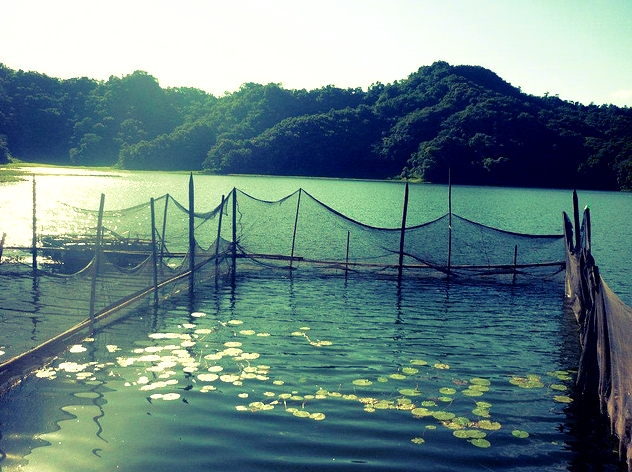
Cage Culture in Rupa Lake

== Lake Economy ==
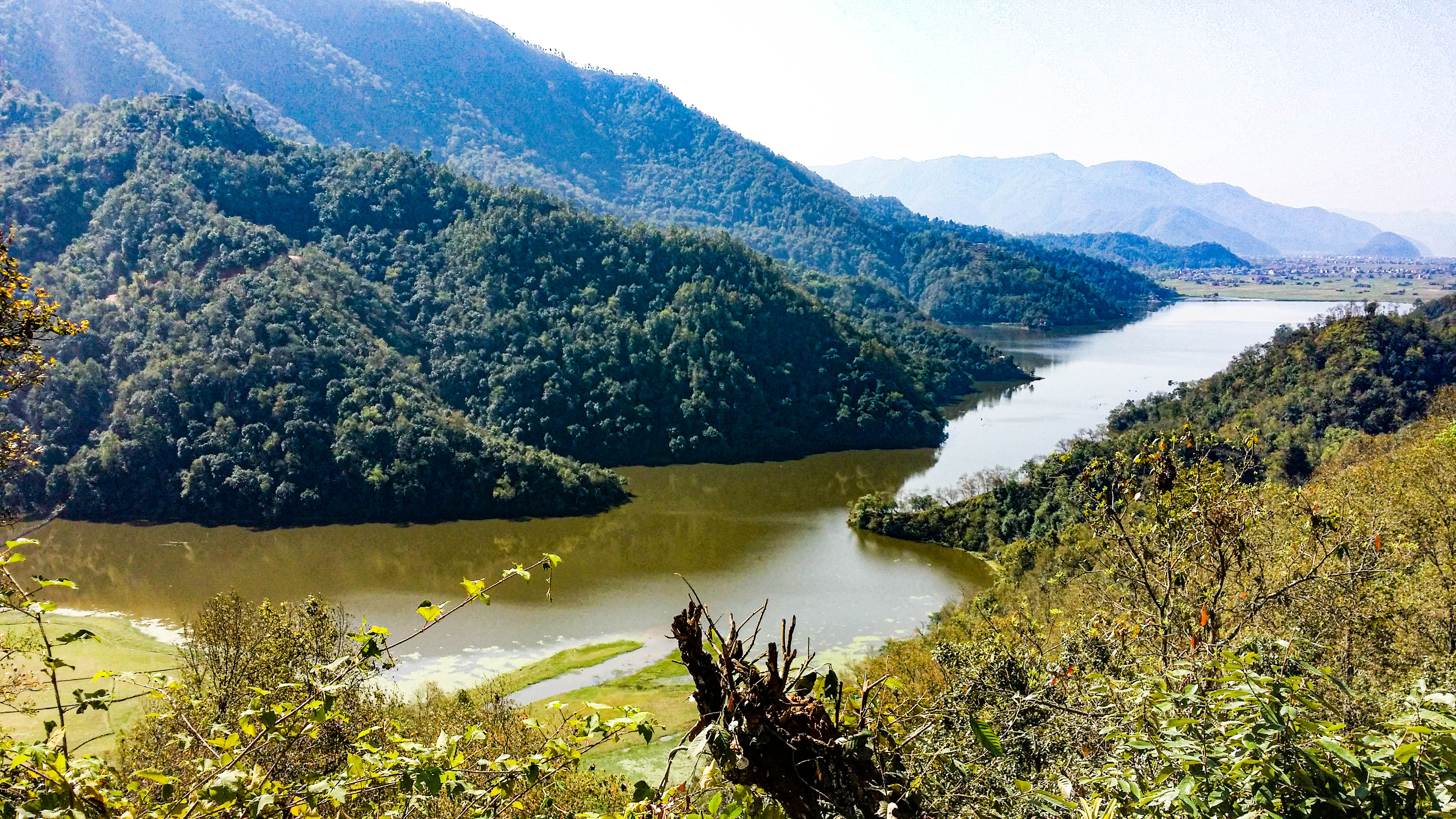
Rupa Lake from view tower

Rupa Lake is the one of main tourism attraction among Begnas Lake of the Pokhara city. It provides enough space for boating experiences for national and international visitors. Cage culture as well as pen culture have been practiced in Rupa Lake for fish farming. Farmers in the Kaski district of Nepal have formed the Rupa Lake Rehabilitation and Fisheries Cooperatives Limited to help protect the watershed.

== See also ==
- Rara Lake
- List of Nepal-related topics
- Annapurna
- Dhaulagiri
- List of lakes of Nepal
