= Maidi Lake =

Maidi lake
- मैदी ताल (Nepali)
- Location within Nepal
- Location: Pokhara, Kaski District, Nepal
- Coordinates: 28.176502805215822°N 84.08103527027149°E
- Type: Lake

Maidi Lake is a freshwater lake located in the Pokhara municipality of Kaski, Nepal.

Maidi Lake

It is the smallest of many lakes of Pokhara and is spread over 1.17 hectares. It has also been reported to be contracting every year, due to erosion on the upper part of the lake.

== See also ==
- Maidi, a village
