= Begnas Lake =

Lake in Kaski district of Nepal

- बेगनास ताल (Nepali)
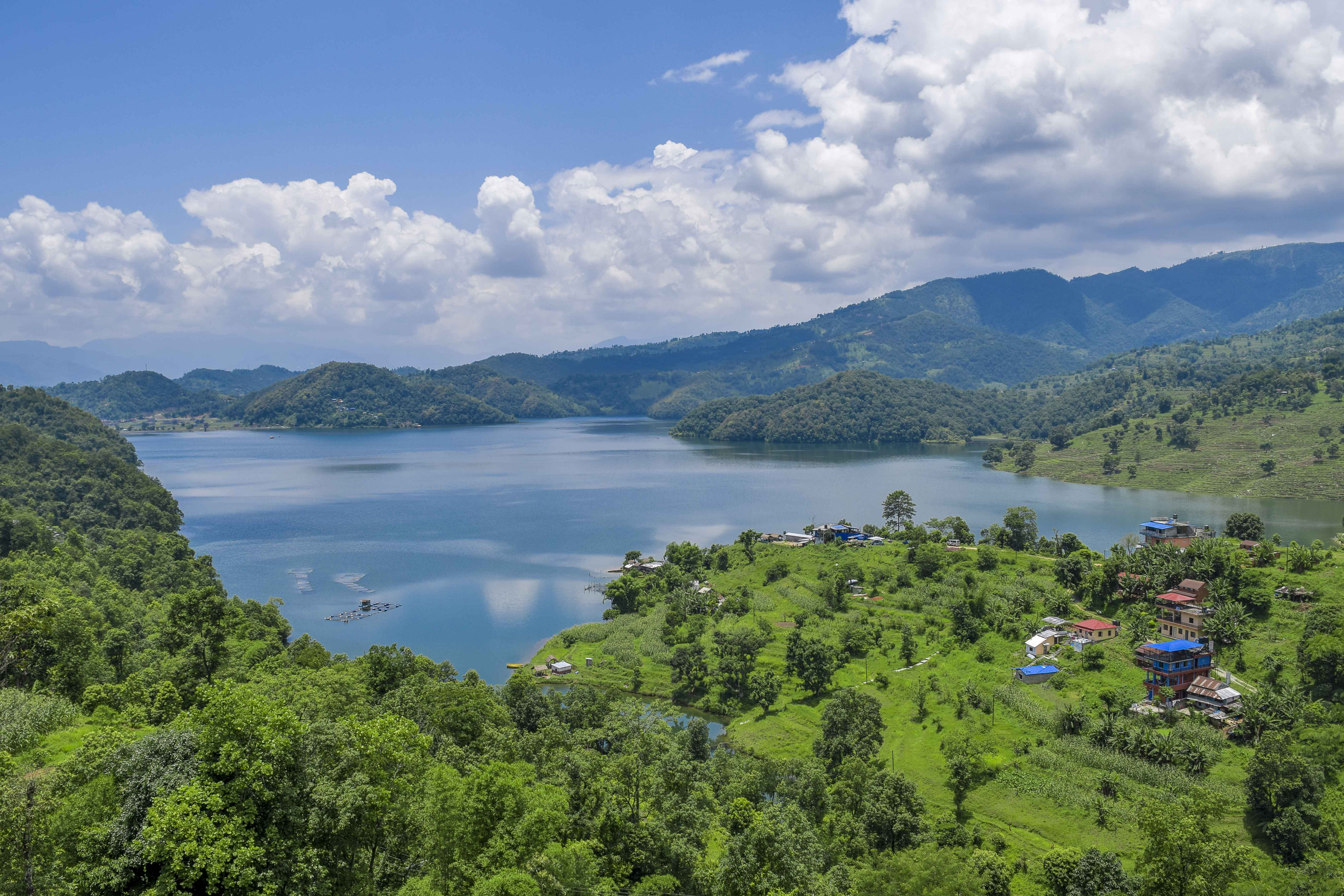
- Begnas Lake

- Location within Gandaki Province Location within Nepal
- Interactive map of Begnas Lake
- Location: Kaski, Nepal
- Coordinates: 28°10′26.2″N 84°05′50.4″E
- Lake type: Natural Freshwater
- Primary inflows: Syankhudi & Talbesi
- Primary outflows: Khudi Khola
- Catchment area: 49 km^{2} (19 sq mi)
- Basin countries: Nepal
- Surface area: 3.28 km^{2} (1.3 sq mi)
- Average depth: 6.6 m (22 ft)
- Max. depth: 10 m (33 ft)
- Water volume: 0.02905 km^{3} (0.00697 cu mi)
- Surface elevation: 650 m (2,133 ft)

Begnas Lake (Nepali: बेगनास ताल) is a freshwater lake in Pokhara Metropolis of Kaski district of Nepal located in the south-east of the Pokhara Valley. The lake is the third largest lake of Nepal and second largest, after Phewa Lake, among the seven lakes in Pokhara Valley. Water level in the lake fluctuates seasonally due to rain, and utilization for irrigation. The water level is regulated through a dam constructed in 1988 on the western outlet stream, Khudi Khola.

== Lake economy ==
Begnas Lake area with a number of resorts is a popular destination for tourists visiting Pokhara. The water from the lake is used for irrigation and some parts of the lake are used as caged fisheries. The Begnas Lake area has a number of swampy areas around it, many of which have been converted to paddy fields. Annapurna and Manaslu Range can be seen very clearly from the Lake.

== Gallery ==
Begnas Lake
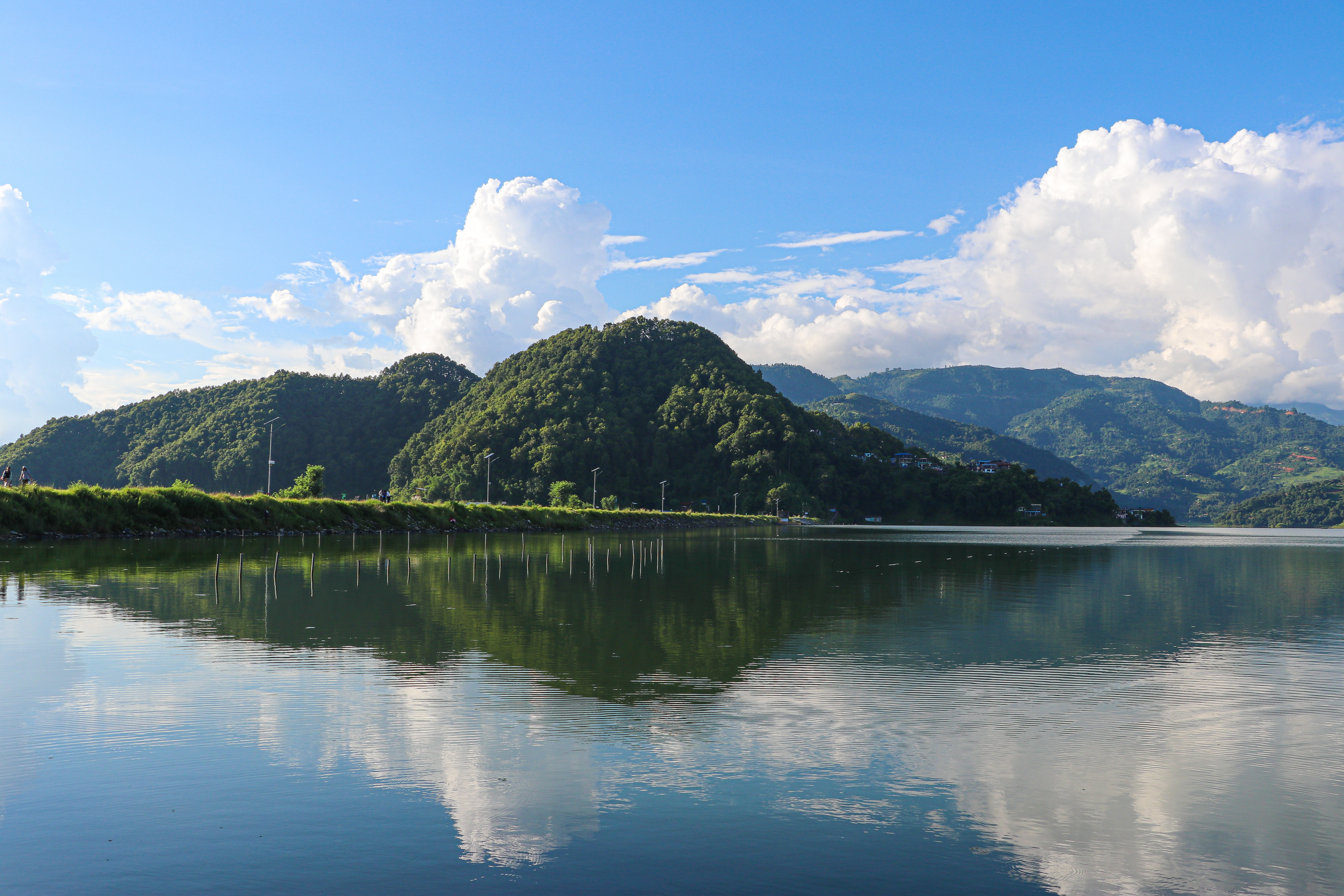
A portion of the lake

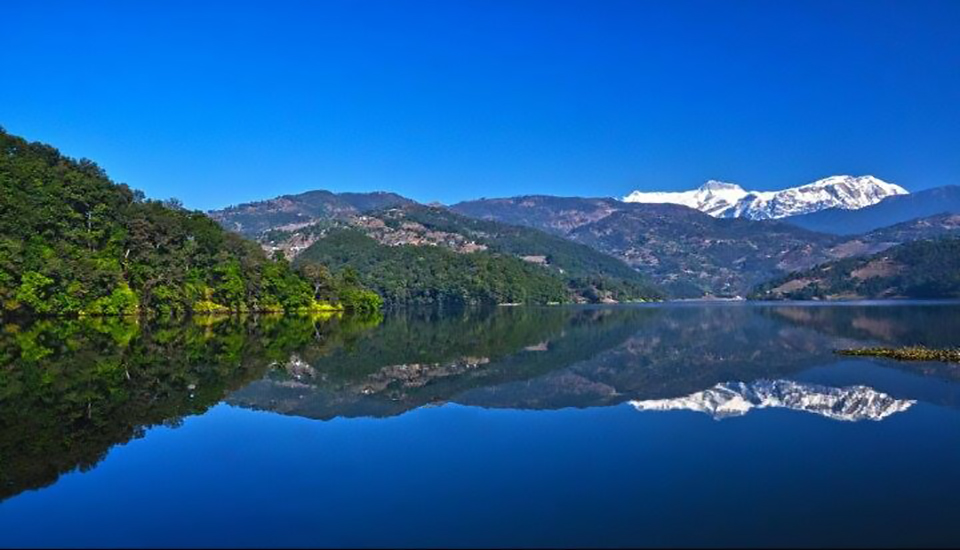
Begnas lake with Annapurna range in backdrop

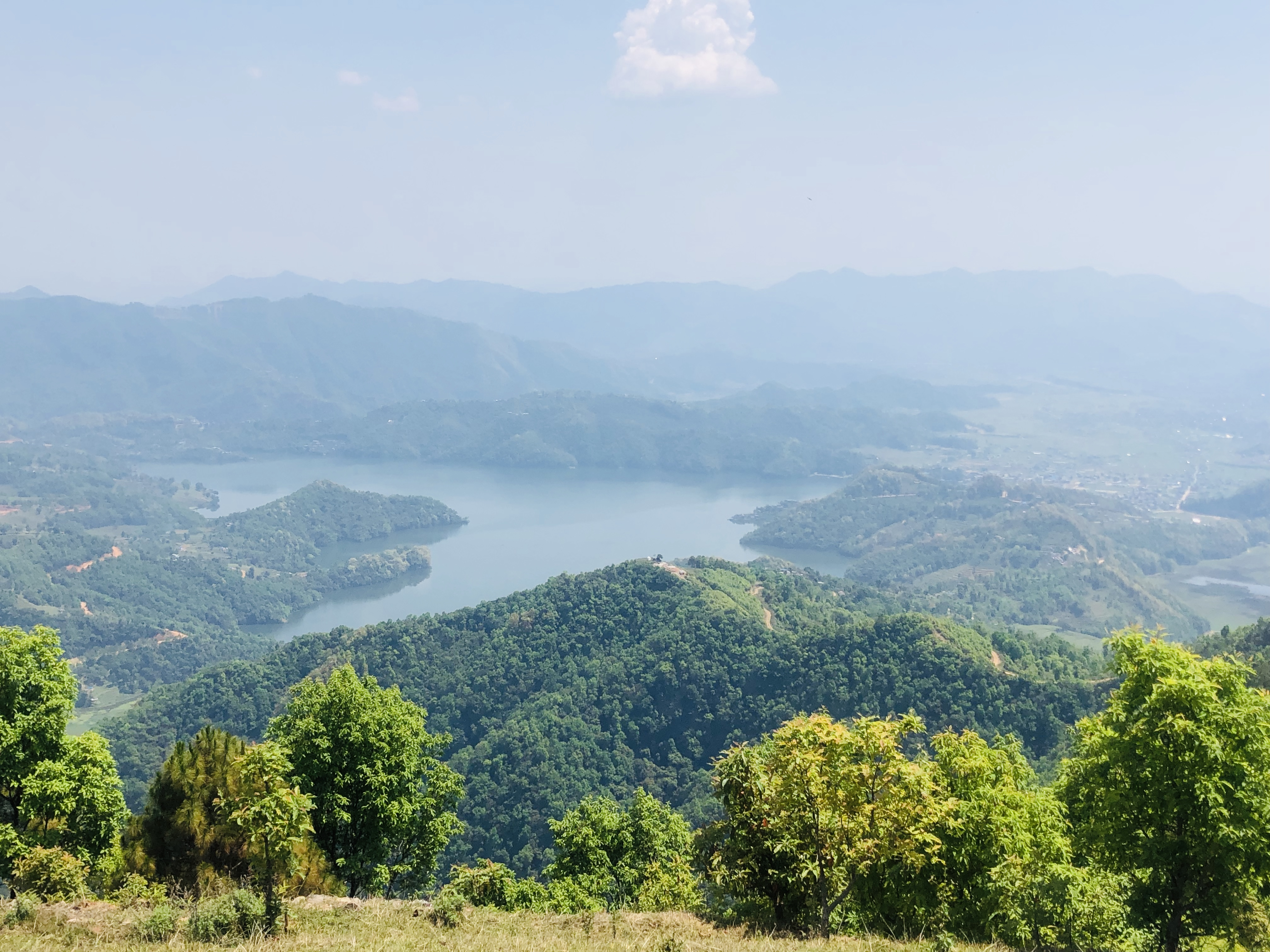
Aerial view of Begnas lake with Maidi Lake
