= List of natural monuments in Karnali Province =

Karnali Province is one of the seven federal provinces of Nepal. Karnali is the largest province of Nepal with an area of 30,313 km^{2} (11,704 sq mi). The province occupies 15% of the Nepal landmass in the size and also holds one of the richest genetic biodiversity in the country. National Park and Protected Areas covered the largest part of Karnali Province. It has climatic diversity ranging from the tropical to permanent snow.

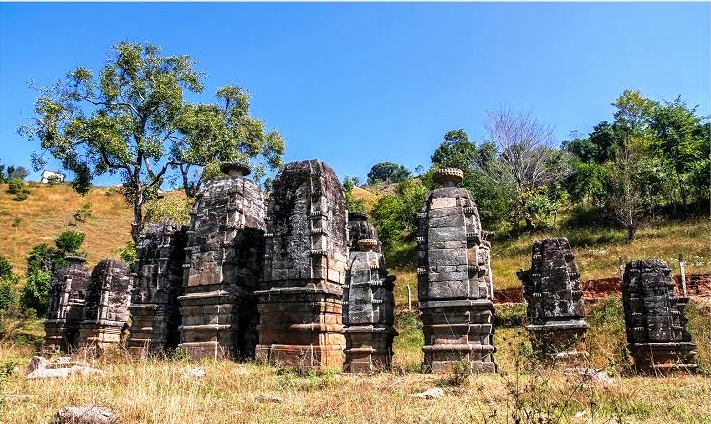
Bhurti Temple Complex of Dailekh

This is a district wise list of natural monuments in Karnali Province, Nepal as officially recognized by and available through the website of the Ministry of Culture, Tourism and Civil Aviation, Ministry of Forests and Environment and District coordination committee, Nepal.

== Dailekh District ==
ID	Name	Type	Location	District	Coordinates	Image
NP-DAI-01	Bhairab Kunda			Dailekh		Upload Photo Upload Photo
NP-DAI-02	Dhaukhani Cave			Dailekh		Upload Photo Upload Photo
NP-DAI-03	Dhaulapada Cave			Dailekh		Upload Photo Upload Photo
NP-DAI-04	Dwari Waterfall			Dailekh		Upload Photo Upload Photo
NP-DAI-05	Ghoda Lake			Dailekh		Upload Photo Upload Photo
NP-DAI-06	Khadigaira Waterfall			Dailekh		Upload Photo Upload Photo
NP-DAI-07	Kushapani Waterfall			Dailekh		Upload Photo Upload Photo
NP-DAI-08	Lalikada Cave			Dailekh		Upload Photo Upload Photo
NP-DAI-09	Lankuri Waterfall			Dailekh		Upload Photo Upload Photo
NP-DAI-10	Madan Lake			Dailekh		Upload Photo Upload Photo
NP-DAI-11	Nake Cave			Dailekh		Upload Photo Upload Photo

== Dolpa District ==
ID	Name	Type	Location	District	Coordinates	Image
NP-DLP-01	Mount Kanjiroba			Dolpa	29°13′N 82°23′E	Mount Kanjiroba Upload Photo
NP-DLP-02	Phoksundo Lake			Dolpa	29°12′30″N 82°57′30″E	Phoksundo Lake Upload Photo
NP-DLP-03	Shey Phoksundo National Park			Dolpa	29°21′N 82°50′E	Upload Photo Upload Photo
NP-DLP-04	Upper Dolpa			Dolpa		Upload Photo Upload Photo

== East Rukum District ==
- Kamal lake

== Humla District ==
ID	Name	Type	Location	District	Coordinates	Image
NP-HUM-01	Tshom Tsho Lake			Humla	30°09′N 81°25′E	Tshom Tsho Lake Upload Photo
NP-HUM-02	Nyalu La Pass			Humla	30°09′N 81°25′E	Upload Photo Upload Photo
NP-HUM-03	Chankheli Mountain			Humla	29°38′N 82°06′E	Upload Photo Upload Photo
NP-HUM-04	Nara La Pass			Humla	30°05′N 81°12′E	Nara La Pass Upload Photo
NP-HUM-05	Seliwaan Dah			Humla		Upload Photo Upload Photo
NP-HUM-06	Daaju Lake			Humla		Upload Photo Upload Photo
NP-HUM-07	Panchamukhi Mountain			Humla	30°17′N 81°28′E	Panchamukhi Mountain Upload Photo
NP-HUM-08	Namka La Pass			Humla		Upload Photo Upload Photo
NP-HUM-09	Selima Tso Lake			Humla	30°16′N 81°41′E	Upload Photo Upload Photo
NP-HUM-10	Nauchare Falls			Humla		Nauchare Falls Upload Photo

== Jajarkot District ==
Nadai Daab, Chalna Daab, Sai Kuwari lek are the natural monuments in Jajarkot.

== Jumla District ==
ID	Name	Type	Location	District	Coordinates	Image
NP-JUM-01	Dansaghu Dobhan			Jumla	29°19′N 81°59′E	Dansaghu Dobhan Upload Photo
NP-JUM-02	Pandava Cave			Jumla		Upload Photo Upload Photo
NP-JUM-03	Sinja Valley			Jumla	29°11′N 81°35′E	Sinja Valley Upload Photo
NP-JUM-04	Tatopani			Jumla	29°14′N 82°03′E	Tatopani Upload Photo
NP-JUM-05	Tila Valley			Jumla		Tila Valley Upload Photo

== Kalikot District ==
ID	Name	Type	Location	District	Coordinates	Image
NP-KAL-01	Dhunge Bagaicha			Kalikot		Upload Photo Upload Photo
NP-KAL-02	Lake Daha			Kalikot		Upload Photo Upload Photo
NP-KAL-03	Pachachhahari Waterfall			Kalikot		Upload Photo Upload Photo
NP-KAL-04	Pachal Waterfall			Kalikot		Upload Photo Upload Photo
NP-KAL-05	Pan Daha			Kalikot		Upload Photo Upload Photo
NP-KAL-06	Phugadh Waterfall			Kalikot		Upload Photo Upload Photo
NP-KAL-07	Rakherwada Daha			Kalikot		Upload Photo Upload Photo
NP-KAL-08	Tila Cave			Kalikot		Upload Photo Upload Photo
NP-KAL-09	Tridevi Lake			Kalikot		Upload Photo Upload Photo

== Mugu District ==
ID	Name	Type	Location	District	Coordinates	Image
NP-MUG-01	Rara Lake			Mugu	29°19′N 82°03′E	Rara Lake Upload Photo
NP-MUG-02	Rara National Park			Mugu	29°18′N 82°02′E	Rara National Park Upload Photo
NP-MUG-03	Saipal			Mugu	29°32′N 81°17′E	Saipal Upload Photo

ID	Name	Location	Coordinate	Image	Features
NP-SAL-01	Kupinde Daha (lake)	Bangadh Kupinde Na.Pa.	Example		Example
NP-SAL-02	Khairabang Bhagawati Mandir	Example	Example	Example	Example
NP-SAL-03	Kachhuwa Daha	Kalimati Ga.Pa.	Example	Example	Example
NP-SAL-04	Kumakh Lek and Kumakhi Mai	Kumakh Ga.Pa.	Example	Example	Example
NP-SAL-05	Chhatreshwari Temple	Chhatreshwari Ga.Pa.	Example	Example	Example
NP-SAL-06	Example	Example	Example	Example	Example
NP-SAL-07	Example	Example	Example	Example	Example
NP-SAL-08	Example	Example	Example	Example	Example
NP-SAL-09	Example	Example	Example	Example	Example
NP-SAL-10	Example	Example	Example	Example	Example

== Surkhet District ==
ID	Name	Type	Location	District	Coordinates	Image
NP-SUR-01	Baraha Lake		Baraha Rural Municipality	Surkhet	28°12′N 82°17′E	Upload Photo Upload Photo
NP-SUR-02	Bulbule Lake		Birendranagar	Surkhet	28°35′N 81°37′E	Bulbule Lake Upload Photo
NP-SUR-03	Jajura Lake		Bidyapur	Surkhet	28°49′N 81°22′E	Upload Photo Upload Photo

== Western Rukum District ==
ID	Name	Type	Location	District	Coordinates	Image
NP-WRUK-01	Dajire Lake		Banfikot	Rukum		Upload Photo Upload Photo
NP-WRUK-02	Khara Lake		Tribeni	Rukum		Upload Photo Upload Photo
NP-WRUK-03	Sital Pokhari		Khalanga	Rukum		Upload Photo Upload Photo
NP-WRUK-04	Sankha Lake		Tribeni	Rukum		Upload Photo Upload Photo
NP-WRUK-05	Syarpu lake		Banfikot	Rukum	28°41′N 82°28′E	Syarpu lake Upload Photo

== See also ==
- List of Natural Monuments in Nepal
