= Bidhya Chapagain =

Nepalese journalist

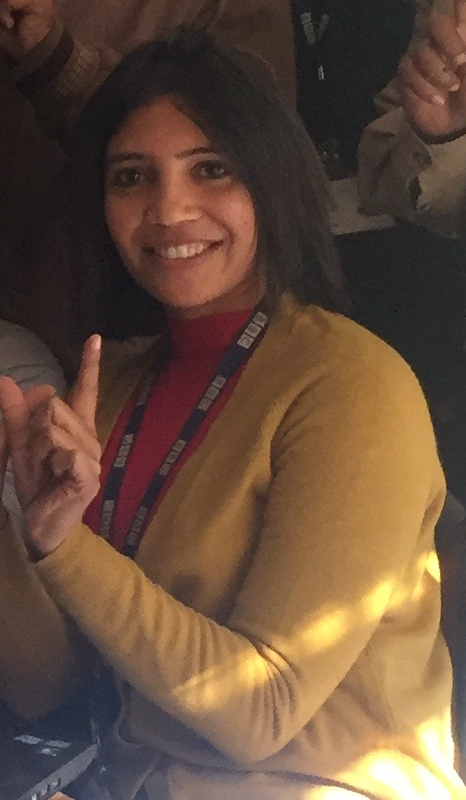
- Born: May 24, 1983 (age 43); Kathmandu, Nepal
- Education: Tribhuwan University
- Occupations: TV Presenter; Journalist
- Notable credit: Herne Katha
- Television: Herne Katha
- Children: JunTara

Bidhya Chapagain (Nepali: विद्या चापागाई) is a Nepali journalist. She is also a presenter of Herne Katha, a television web series started March 2018.

== Career ==
She worked as a presenter for Sajha Sawal, a weekly social discussion and debate program in Nepal. "Sajha Sawal" became the most popular program, airing weekly on Kantipur Television at that time. She began presenting the show in July 2014 and quit in January 2018, co-founding Herne Katha. She has worked as a journalist for over a decade in radio, television, and newspaper media. Herne Katha was founded in collaboration with Kamal Kumar. Herne Katha has crossed over 1 million subscribers on YouTube. It has become one of the most popular documentaries in Nepal, focusing on the lives of unknown Nepali people.

== Early life ==
Chapagain's childhood was spent with her parents in Gothatar, Kathmandu. She grew up helping her parents on their farm. She was inspired to become a journalist from listening to the radio with her brother and reading the newspaper in her school library. Her mother was only 13 when she got married. Chapagain got a lot of support from her mother, who wanted her daughter to be well educated.

== Awards ==
The Man Who Died Once - 'Best Documentary Award' in Kathmandu International Mountain Film Festival (KIMFF 2018) Directed by - Bidhya Chapagain and Kamal Kumar

Bagh Ko Bangara - 'Audience Award' in Kathmandu International Mountain Film Festival (KIMFF 2022) - Produced by Chapagain, directed by Kamal Kumar.
