= Bagh Ko Bangara =

2022 Nepali documentary film

- Nepali: बाघको ब‌ङ्गारा
- Directed by: Kamal Kumar
- Written by: Kamal Kumar
- Produced by: Bidhya Chapagain
- Cinematography: Jeevan Rijal; Prakash Devkota
- Edited by: Sandesh Pariyar
- Music by: Rubin Shrestha
- Release date: December 8, 2022 (Nepal)
- Language: Nepali

Bagh Ko Bangara (Nepali: बाघको ब‌ङ्गारा; transl. The Tiger's Jaw) is a 2022 Nepali documentary film directed by Kamal Kumar. It premiered at the 2022 Kathmandu International Mountain Film Festival (KIMFF). It was also awarded with KIMFF Audience Award at the same event. The film was produced by the Herne Katha team, who created it while searching for stories for upcoming episodes of Herne Katha. It shows the lives of rural Nepalis, focusing on the struggles of honey hunters and their journey to collect honey.

== Synopsis ==
The documentary follows a group of villagers from rural Nepal as they embark on a dangerous expedition to harvest honey from steep cliffs and return safely home.

== Production ==
- Kamal Kumar - director, writer
- Bidhya Chapagain - presenter, producer
- Prakash Devkota - cinematographer
- Jeevan Rijal - cinematographer
- Sandesh Pariyar - editor
- Rubin Shrestha - music composer

== Accolades ==
Year	Awards	Category	Nominee	Result	Ref(s)
2022	Kathmandu International Mountain Film Festival	Audience Award	Bagh Ko Bangara	Won	
