= Ganesh Panday =

Ganesh Panday (born March 2. 1986) is a Nepalese filmmaker and journalist. His most recent film about earthquakes in Nepal has won 15 International Awards

Similarly, his another award-winning documentary film ’Co-husband’ is also popular around the world Co-husband wins best short film award in canada

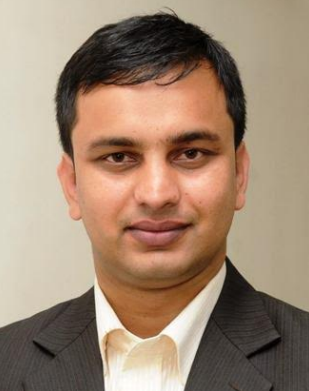
Ganesh Panday Profile Picture

== Life and career ==
Ganesh was born in the rural district of Lamjung, Nepal, it is here in Lamjung that he began his journalism career . He completed his bachelor's degree at Marshyangdi Multiple Campus, where he studied Business Studies. His interest in journalism was born out of a lack of justice in communication for Nepali people, especially women's rights. He started his journalism career covering the civil war in Nepal, his work covering this brought him to the attention of national newspaper ‘Samacharpatra’ where he would become a writer. He got national attention for his humanitarian efforts when he started working for Radio Nepal, making him the first journalist to gain national recognition from the Lamjung region. He would continue to grow his exposure and work, becoming a news anchor for Nepal 1 Television.

Ganesh began making documentary films as a result of the Maoist civil war in Nepal, capturing rare footage of the violence towards victims. Ganesh produced ‘Antim Sandesh’(The Last Message), which would become an award-winning documentary at the Kathmandu Human Rights Festival and Kathmandu Short Film Festival in 2012. The film would cover the disappearance of Nepalese people during the Civil War. He also produced ‘Marera Bachekaharu’(The Resurrected), showcasing the treatment of torture victims during the civil war. This would begin to increase his reputation for documentary film making.

In 2015, Ganesh directed the documentary “Bhagyale Bachekaharu (Nepal Earthquake: Heroes, Survivors and Miracles)”, which would take Ganesh onto the global stage as it was screened at Wisconsin University and City University, New York. This documentary highlights the damage caused by the earthquakes in Nepal and highlights significant stories of survival, rescue and effects of the destruction. Following the personal stories of people who were stuck for days, lost parents, siblings and loved ones to those who have to attempt to reconstruct their lives.

The documentary features interviews various survivors, rescue personnel that were present at the scene, and national poet Laureate Madhav Prasad Ghimire, who survived both the 1934 and 2015 earthquakes. The Miracle of Survival serves as a historical documentation during the aftermath of the earthquakes and showcases the psychological and physical scars left on the Nepali people. The film was shown at Kathmandu International Mountain Film Festival, Shimla International Film Festival, Nashik International Film Festival, Edinburgh Nepali Film Festival, Noida International Film Festival, Vaasa Wildlife Nature Film Festival, Rajasthan International Film Festival, Cervino Cine Mountain Festival and the Houses of Parliament in London. The film has to date been screened in over 32 countries and has won 15 international awards.

Ganesh continues to make documentary films with his production company; Shine Media Pvt. Ltd and is an editor for the popular online newspaper Dainik Nepal.

== Films ==
- The Last Message (Heart Beaten Story of Disappeared People's Family)
- The Resurrection (Painful Story of Tortured Victim of Nepal)
- The Brave Sister (A sisters Relentless Struggle for Justice)
- Miracle Survivals in Nepal Earthquake
- Stop Torture
- Lamjung Tourism
- Nepalese struggle in Japan
- Bhagyale Bachekaharu (Nepal Earthquake: Heroes, Survivors and Miracles)
- Civil Soldiers https://english.nepalbahas.com/news/detail/249129/

== Awards ==
- Best Documentary Award, Kathmandu International Mountain Film Festival (KIMFF), December 2015
- Public Choice Award, Kathmandu International Mountain Film Festival (KIMFF), December 2015
- Best Documentary Award, Shimla International Film Festival, India
- Best International Documentary Award, Nashik International Film Festival, India
- Best Documentary Award, Edinburgh Nepali Film Festival, UK
- Best Documentary Jury Award, Noida International Film Festival, India
- Jury Award, Vaasa Wildlife Nature Film Festival, Finland
- Golden Phoenix Award, Malaysia
- Best Documentary Award, Dhaka International Film Festival, Jan, 2017
- Best Director Award, Rajasthan International Film Festival, Jan, 2017
- Silver Bodhisanva Award, Bodhisanva International Film Festival, India, Feb, 2017
- Best Documentary Award, Marietta International Film Festival, USA
- Best documentary award, Society of visual anthropology film and media festival, Canada, November, co-husband wins best short film award in canada
