= Indreni Khojdai Jada =

2013 Nepali drama film

- Theatrical release poster
- Directed by: Sahara Sharma
- Written by: Sahara Sharma
- Produced by: Abhimanyu Dixit
- Production company: Gaythali Entertainment
- Release date: December 2013 (KIMFF)
- Country: Nepal
- Language: Nepali

Indreni Khojdai Jada (Nepali: इन्द्रेणी खोज्दै जादा, lit. 'Chasing Rainbows') is a 2013 Nepali drama film, directed and written by Sahara Sharma in her debut. The film is produced by Abhimanyu Dixit under the banner of Gaythali Entertainment. The film stars Kritika Lamsal, Deepak Ghimire, Sanam Pyakurel, Sahayog Adhikary, and Dipendra K.C. The film generally received mixed feedback from the critics. The film premiered at the 11th edition of Kathmandu International Mountain Film Festival.

== Plot ==
Three siblings move to Kathmandu to follow their dreams.

== Cast ==
- Kritika Lamsal
- Deepak Ghimire
- Sanam Pyakurel
- Sahayog Adhikary
- Dipendra K.C.

== Release and reception ==
In 2013, Indreni Khojdai Jada premiered at the 11th edition of Kathmandu International Mountain Film Festival. At the festival it won Best Fiction Film.

The staff of Nepali Times wrote, "After numerous short movies, Indreni Khojdai Jada marks the wonderful silver screen debut of the talented filmmaker Sahara Sharma who has donned the hat of writer, director, and cinematographer for this particular movie. Our wait for a good storyteller has finally come to a dreamy end".
