= Sahara Sharma =

Nepali filmmaker

- Born: Kathmandu, Nepal
- Occupations: Filmmaker, Director, and Writer
- Employer: Gauthali Entertainment
- Known for: Founder of Gauthali Entertainment; First Nepali Woman filmmaker to receive the Hubert Bals Fund grant; Director of Ek Mutthi Badal: My Share of Sky

Sahara Sharma is a Nepalese filmmaker, director, and writer based in Kathmandu, Nepal. She is the founder and CEO of Gauthali Entertainment, a women-led production company focused on feminist cinema.

She became the first Nepali woman filmmaker to receive the Hubert Bals Fund + Europe Post-Production Grant for her feature film Ek Mutthi Badal: My Share of Sky. She is also the youngest female director to have opened the Kathmandu International Mountain Film Festival.

== Early life and education ==
Sahara Sharma was born and raised in Kathmandu, Nepal in the late 1980s. She graduated with a Master of Science in Communication from Bangalore University, India.

== Career ==
Sharma's films deal with social issues, migration, and women's lives in Nepal.

=== Chasing Rainbows (2013) ===
Her debut film Chasing Rainbows (Nepali: इन्द्रेनी खोज्दै जादा) follows three siblings who move to Kathmandu, touching on sexuality and depression among young Nepalis. In 2013, the film opened the Kathmandu International Mountain Film Festival, making Sharma the youngest female director to do so. The film received the Critics' Award at the Toronto Nepali Film Festival in 2014.

=== Ek Mutthi Badal: My Share of Sky (2026) ===
Ek Mutthi Badal: My Share of Sky is Sharma's debut feature film and Nepal's first woman-led international co-production, between companies from Nepal and Germany. The film received €60,000 from the Hubert Bals Fund + Europe Post-Production Grant, administered by the International Film Festival Rotterdam.

In 2021 the project went to the NFDC Film Bazaar, where producer Abhimanyu Dixit won the Rotterdam Lab Award. The film was released theatrically in Nepal on 15 May 2026.

== Filmography ==
Year	Title	Role	Notes
2012	Untitled short film	Director	Shortlisted for the Tony Blair Faith Foundation
2013	Chasing Rainbows (इन्द्रेनी खोज्दै जादा)	Director, Writer	Opening film at KIMFF 2013; Critics' Award, Toronto Nepali Film Festival 2014
2026	Ek Mutthi Badal: My Share of Sky	Director, Writer	Hubert Bals Fund grant; Nepal–Germany co-production; theatrical release 15 May 2026
