= List of natural monuments in Madhesh Province =

Province No. 2 is one of the seven federal provinces of Nepal. Province No. 2 is the smallest province of Nepal with an area of 9,661 km^{2} (3,730 sq mi). The province occupies 6% of the Nepal landmass in the size. Parsa National Park is the attraction of this province.

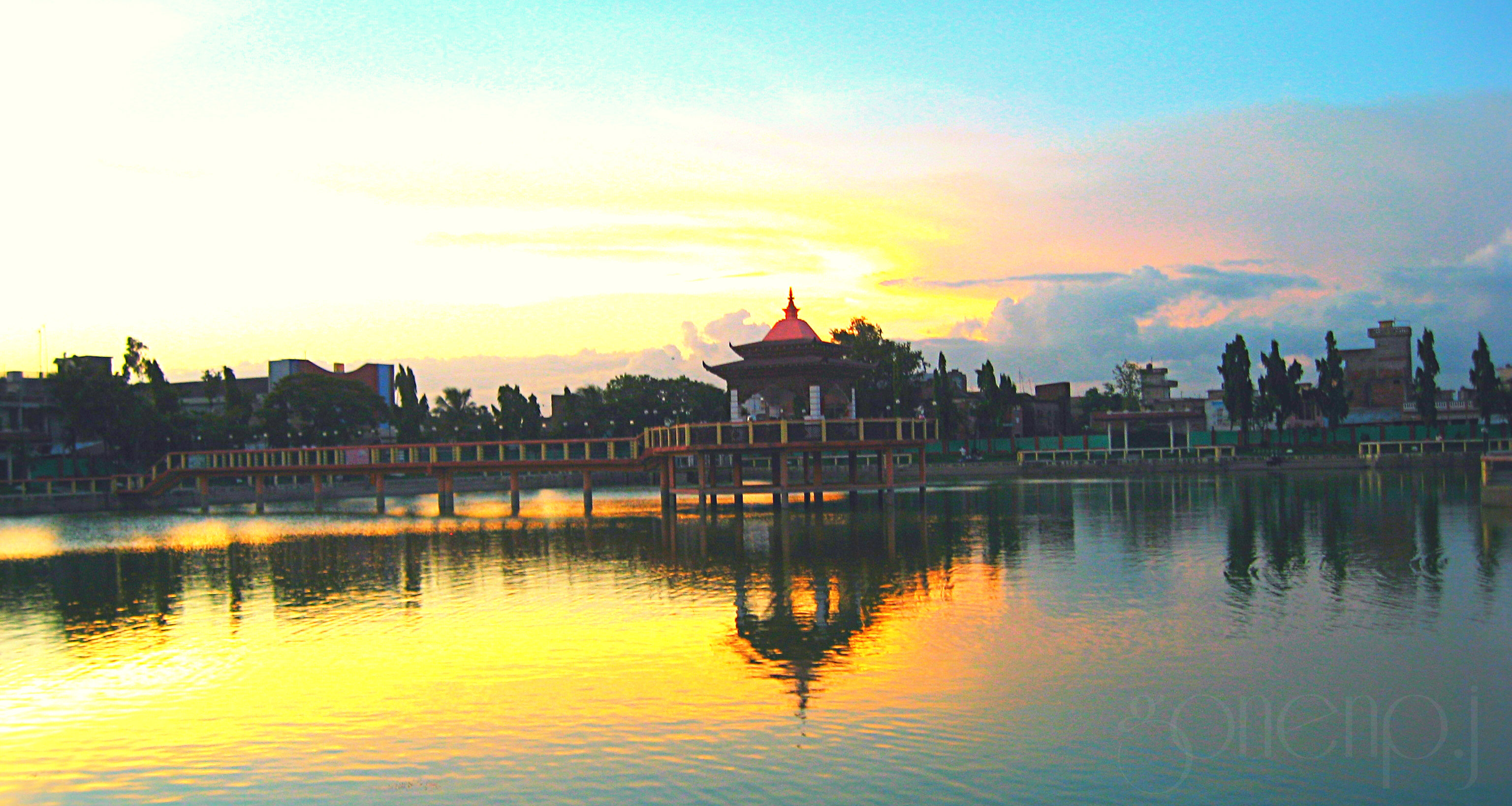
Ghadiarwa Pokhari, Birgunj

This is a district wise list of natural monuments in Province No. 2, Nepal as officially recognized by and available through the website of the Ministry of Culture, Tourism and Civil Aviation, Ministry of Forests and Environment and District coordination committee, Nepal.

== Saptari District ==
ID	Name	Type	Location	District	Coordinates	Image
NP-SAP-01	Chure Hill Region		Bhardaha to Kadmaha	Saptari		Chure Hill Region Upload Photo
NP-SAP-02	Lohjara Lake		Tirhut Rural Municipality	Saptari		Upload Photo Upload Photo
NP-SAP-03	Sundari Khola		Kanchan Roop	Saptari		Upload Photo Upload Photo
NP-SAP-04	Dhaarapani Region			Saptari		Upload Photo Upload Photo
NP-SAP-05	Raja Ji Thaan Complex		Manraja, Barsain Municipality	Saptari		Upload Photo Upload Photo

== Siraha District ==
ID	Name	Type	Location	District	Coordinates	Image
NP-SIR-01	Patari Pond		Laxmipur Patari	Siraha		Upload Photo Upload Photo
NP-SIR-02	Kumbikhaari Lake		Tetariya, Golbazar	Siraha		Upload Photo Upload Photo
NP-SIR-03	Salahesh Garden		Lahan	Siraha		Upload Photo Upload Photo

== Dhanusa District ==
ID	Name	Type	Location	District	Coordinates	Image
NP-DHN-01	Parashuramkunda			Dhanusa		Upload Photo Upload Photo
NP-DHN-02	Dhanusa Sagar Pond			Dhanusa		Upload Photo Upload Photo
NP-DHN-03	Ganga Sagar Pond			Dhanusa		Upload Photo Upload Photo
NP-DHN-04	Godar			Dhanusa		Upload Photo Upload Photo

== Mahottari District ==
ID	Name	Type	Location	District	Coordinates	Image
NP-MHR-01	Jaleshwar Pond		Jaleshwar	Mahottari		Upload Photo Upload Photo
NP-MHR-02	Kanchan Wan			Mahottari		Upload Photo Upload Photo
NP-MHR-03	Dhruva Kunda			Mahottari		Upload Photo Upload Photo
NP-MHR-04	Nun Thar		Chandrapur	Mahottari		Upload Photo Upload Photo
NP-MHR-05	Ramchuwa Parvat		Chandrapur	Mahottari		Upload Photo Upload Photo

== Sarlahi District ==
Source:

== Rautahat District ==
ID	Name	Type	Location	District	Coordinates	Image
NP-RAU-01	Badewa Lake			Rautahat		Upload Photo Upload Photo
NP-RAU-02	Bharthar Lake			Rautahat		Upload Photo Upload Photo

== Bara District ==
ID	Name	Type	Location	District	Coordinates	Image
NP-BAR-01	Ratanpur Jungle		Ratanpur	Bara	27°14′N 85°00′E	Upload Photo Upload Photo
NP-BAR-02	Jharokhar Pond		Simraungadh	Bara	26°52′N 85°09′E	Upload Photo Upload Photo
NP-BAR-03	Ishra Pond		Simraungadh	Bara	26°53′N 85°08′E	Upload Photo Upload Photo

== Parsa District ==
ID	Name	Type	Location	District	Coordinates	Image
NP-PRS-01	Parsa National Park			Parsa	27°17′N 84°12′E	Upload Photo Upload Photo
NP-PRS-02	Ghadiarwa Pokhari		Birgunj	Parsa	27°02′N 84°49′E	Upload Photo Upload Photo

== See also ==
- List of Natural Monuments in Nepal
