= The Contagious Apparitions of Dambarey Dendrite =

2013 Nepali drama short film

- Directed by: Pooja Gurung; Bibhusan Basnet
- Starring: Anupam Sharma
- Release date: October 2013 (Abu Dhabi)
- Country: Nepal
- Language: Nepali

The Contagious Apparitions of Dambarey Dendrite is a 2013 Nepali drama short film, directed by Pooja Gurung, Bibhusan Basnet in their debut. The film stars Anupam Sharma in the lead role. The Contagious Apparitions of Dambarey Dendrite is about hallucinating Dambarey (Anupam Sharma) and his street gang.

== Plot ==
A kid Dambarey causes trouble around Kathmandu.

== Cast ==
- Anupam Sharma as Dambarey

== Release and reception ==
The film won various awards including Golden Comma Award by National Institute of Design, Child Protection Award by Abu Dhabi Film Festival, and Jury Special Mention- Fiction by Kathmandu International Mountain Film Festival. The staff of Nepali Times wrote, "This is an unflinching look at some of the most vulnerable members of our society, and if Dambarey's visions are fantastical, they never lift him very far from the anomie, deprivation and violence of his existence".
