= Sunakali =

- Directed by: Bhojraj Bhat
- Written by: Bhojraj Bhat
- Produced by: Good Neighbors Nepal
- Cinematography: Prakash KC, Manoj Maharjan, Jeewan Shrestha
- Edited by: Bharat Mani Regmi
- Music by: Rubin Shrestha (Kutumba)
- Release date: 2014
- Country: Nepal
- Languages: Nepali; English subtitles

Sunakali is a 2014 documentary film directed by Bhojraj Bhat and produced by Good Neighbours Nepal. Sunakali is about a girls' football team that overcomes all obstacles to play football, finally attaining glory. It stars local girls from the Mugu district of remote Nepal which also lies in a mountainous region. Bhat's interest in the subject matter rose from this journalistic experience and an opportunity to highlight the aspects of the majority of Nepalese society that thwart their progress. Production began in early 2000 with Bhat covering the Maoist insurgency in remote areas of Nepal. Upon its release, Sunakali received tremendous acclaim and awards from all over the world. It has received awards like Best Documentary Diamond Award and has been officially selected at Kendal Mountain Film Festival. FIFA's official FIFA TV also featured a special report on Sunakali, titled "Meet the 'Himalayan Messi'" on August 21, 2016.

== Plot ==
The documentary includes a number of girls from Mugu district who are not allowed to play football or wear half-pants (shorts). The girls explain their problems to the production team and express their desire to play football. They share their struggles of playing football at an altitude above 3500m and having to deal with parents. Sunakali is a girl from Mugu, a harsh district in the least developed region of Nepal, and she loves football. Together with her friend, they form Team Mugu, which goes on to win a tournament at the national level.

== Screening ==
Sunakali was screened as the World Premier and was the opening film of Kathmandu International Mountain Film Festival (KIMFF), 11–15 December 2014. To date Sunakali has received 16 international awards.

== Awards ==
1. Kathmandu International Mountain Film Festival (KIMFF), 11–15 December 2014. Award: Best ICIMOD Mountain Film Award, received USD $1000
2. Kathmandu International Mountain Film Festival (KIMFF), 11–15 December 2014. Award: Best Documentary Jury Mention award
3. International Premier: Mountain Film Festival Domzale, 23–27 February 2015. Award: Jury award in the nature and culture genre
4. Canada Premier: 6th Annual Toronto Nepali Film Festival (TNFF), 28 March 2015. Award: Audience Choice Award, received USD $1000
5. Pakistan International Mountain Film Festival (PIMFF), 13–14 June 2015. Award: Best Documentary Award
6. Cinerockom International Film Festival, USA, 1–6 September 2015. Award: Best Documentary Diamond Award
7. Berg Film Festival, Tegernsee, Germany, 21–25 October 2015. First Prize (€1,000) in the category of Mountain Life
8. 33rd Sport Movies & TV - Milano International FICTS Fest, Italy, 2015. Guirlande d'Honneur in the category of Movies & TV Football
9. 33rd BBVA Mountain Film Festival of Torelló, Spain, 2015. Best Film – Mountain Wilderness
10. 15th International Mountain Film Festival in Bansko, Bulgaria, 2015. The Award of the Municipality of Bansko
11. Global Sport Media Pearl Awards, Abu Dhabi, UAE, 15 December 2015. 3rd-place award, received $5000 USD cash prize in the category of Documentary
12. Bilbao Mendi Film Festival, 10–20 December 2015. Best Nature & Culture Film Award
13. Mountain & Adventure Film Festival, USA, 2016. First runner-up, Cultural Award
14. Thinking Football Film Festival, Spain, 2016. Best Documentary
15. 7th Football Film Festival, Brazil. Best Feature Documentary
16. 2016 New Zealand Mountain Film Festival. Special Jury Award
