= Herne Katha =

Nepali web documentary series

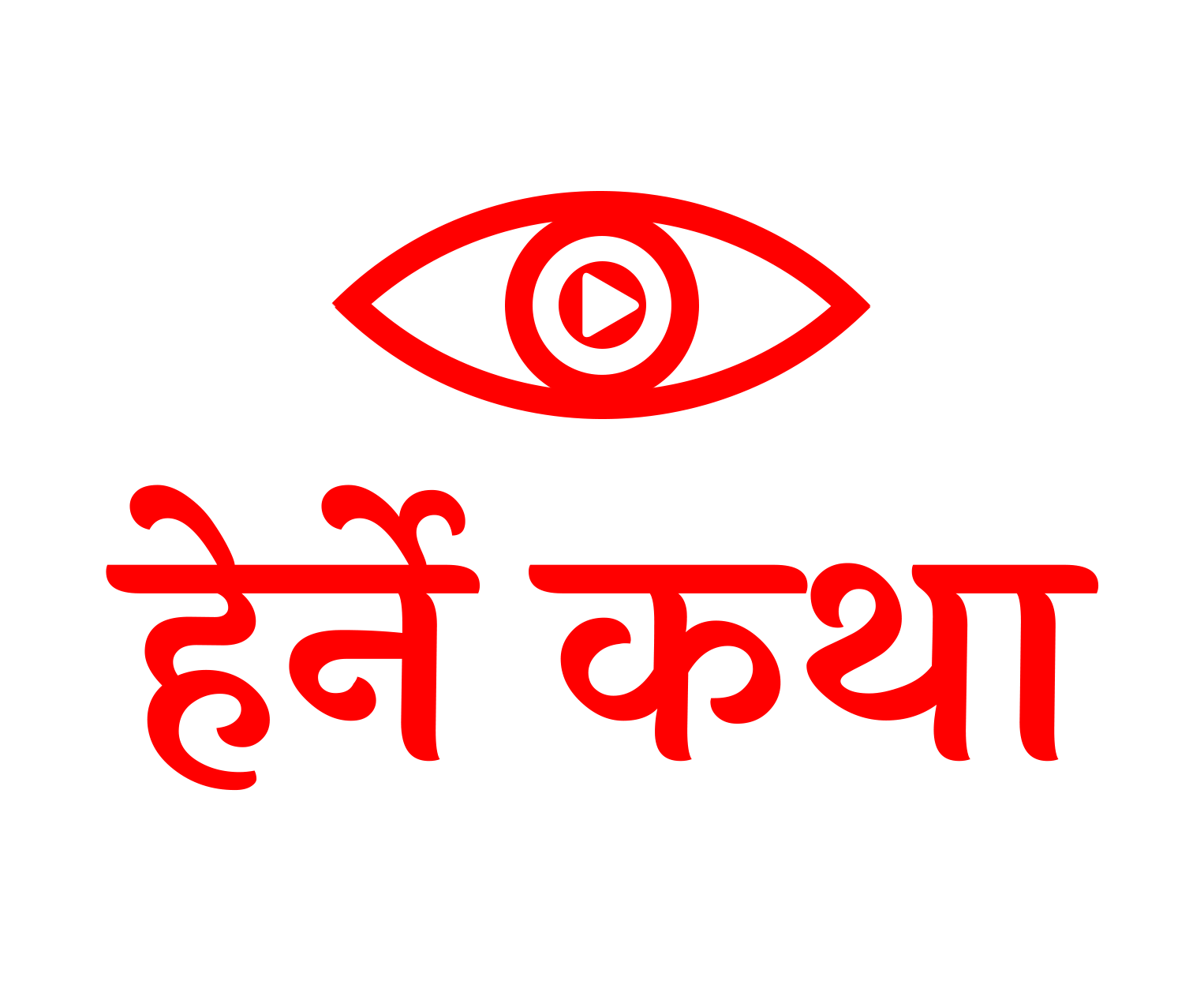
- Logo of Herne Katha which shows "Herne Katha" written in Devanagari script.
- Genre: Documentary
- Written by: Kamal Kumar
- Directed by: Kamal Kumar
- Presented by: Bidhya Chapagain
- Country of origin: Nepal
- Original language: Nepali
- No. of seasons: 1
- No. of episodes: 166

Production
- Producer: Tana Bana Digital
- Cinematography: Jeevan Rijal
- Editor: Sandesh Pariyar
- Camera setup: Multi Camera
- Production company: Tana Bana Digital

Original release
- Network: YouTube
- Release: 1 March 2018 – present

Herne Katha

YouTube information
- Channel: Herne Katha
- Subscribers: 1.65 million
- Views: 225 million
- Last updated: 19 December 2025
- Website: hernekatha.com

Herne Katha is a Nepali web documentary series that includes stories from the underrepresented communities of Nepal. The name Herne Katha, which translates to "Stories to be watched" in English.

== Overview ==
Herne Katha was co-founded by Bidhya Chapagain and Kamal Kumar. It first premiered on YouTube in March 2018 . Stories feature individuals and communities from different parts of Nepal.

== Reception ==
The show has been popular among Nepali audiences and it has gained a lot of praises in social media.

== Episodes of Herne Katha ==
No.	Title	Original release date
1	"Eauta Schoolko Katha"	March 1, 2018
Inside A girls-only Muslim School in Southern Nepal
2	"Chaukiniko Katha"	March 15, 2018
Old Dalit women look after a village in Mountain while everybody migrates to a warmer place in winter.
3	"Gharko Katha"	April 1, 2018
A family of Bhutanese refugees resettled in Canada comes to revisit their camps in Eastern Nepal.
4	"Sunko Katha"	April 15, 2018
Women from Sonaha Community in West Nepal mine gold in river for living.
5	"Batoko Katha"	May 1, 2018
A 72 years old man with a concrete-like solid ambition to build a road for his children and wife who were blind by birth.
6	"Chiya Baganka Shikari Haru"	May 15, 2018
Chiya Baganka Shikariharu' is about rat hunters near a tea estate in Jhapa, Nepal. Rat Hunting is an old tradition of Sathal (Satar) community in Nepal. They go hunting whenever they have free time. Rat hunting is also part of their festivals and other rituals. Apart from rat, they hunt for other rodents in nearby tea estates..
7	"Ghodeko Katha"	June 1, 2018
Many people from Tharu Community in western Nepal are using horses to trade rice and other seasonal grains.
8	"Zubaida Khatunko Katha"	June 15, 2018
A Muslim woman who dares to resume her study from grade 8 after being married and mother of 4 children.
9	"Eauta Adhyaro Katha"	July 1, 2018
Story of sex workers of Badi Community of western Nepal.
10	"Wada Number 22 ko Katha"	July 15, 2018
Lives inside a densely populated Muslim village in Nepalgunj, western Nepal.
11	"Simanako Katha"	August 1, 2018
Story of a village across Mechi River in Jhapa Nepal near the India Nepal border.
12	"Eklo Katha"	August 15, 2018
Story of a 12-year-old boy Sajan BK in Eastern Nepal, who lives alone.
13	"Babanpurka Gothalaharu"	September 1, 2018
Life of the shepherds of Babanpur.
14	"Zindagiko Katha"	September 15, 2018
Zindagiko Katha (Story of Life) tells some painful stories of ups and downs of old people living in Bishranti Ashram in Mulghat in Dhankuta.
15	"Bau Chhoriko Katha"	October 1, 2018
Story of a father and daughter from Eastern Nepal who make living from singing. Gandharbas (Gaine) are travelling musicians with their instrument called Sarangi.
16	"Raharko Katha"	October 15, 2018
A physically disabled boy from a poor family in Achham district that has a strong desire to read and write.
17	"Gajendra Sirko Katha"	November 1, 2018
Jana Samyukta Primary School in Dhodeni Gumi was on the verge of merging with another school. One day Gajendra Rana Magar arrived as a volunteer teacher and the school is changed forever. Now, other school in the areas are in the verge of merging with this school.
18	"Bhurti Gaunko Katha"	November 15, 2018
It is difficult to find young and teenager in this village of Dailekh district in western Nepal. Watch the episodes to know why?
19	"Kinarako Katha"	December 1, 2018
Story of people in a village near Narayani River in Chitwan National Park, who make living from river and jungle.
20	"Rauteka Katha"	December 15, 2018
Stories of the last group of a nomad community in Nepal known as 'Raute'
21	"Chudeli Gaunko Katha"	January 1, 2019
Stories inside a small Muslim village called 'Chudeli Gaun' in Achham district in Western Nepal.
22	"Durga Bajyaiko Katha"	January 15, 2019
Name: Durga Pandey, Age: 60, Grade: 2, Bhrikuti Primary School, Dadeldhura
23	"Head Mistriko Katha"	February 1, 2019
Story of courage and struggle of Kamala Chaudhari, a former Kamlari (bonded labour) from Dang, western Nepal.
24	"Belly Blues"	February 15, 2019
Story of a young boy seeking his identity, struggling with poverty, trying to win life.
25	"Netako Katha"	March 1, 2019
Story of a Tharu woman from Dang, who happened to be a leader of her village.
26	"Jogiko Katha"	March 15, 2019
Story of a 'Jogi' who walks out at night to make rounds of other's houses hymning mantras using their blowing horn to make conch-like sound. It is believed that the mantras and the blowing horn scares away evil spirit and restores good luck. A long dated tradition in many communities in Nepal.
27	"Duita Katha"	April 1, 2019
Duita Katha (Two Stories) shows lives of two different Nepali women in their own world, both from Western Nepal. Jhupri Kumari Bhandari from Achham and Himani Tharu from Bardiya.
28	"Akhada"	April 15, 2019
Padahari village in Palhinandan Gaupalika in Southern Nawalparasi is home to many Pahalwan (wrestler). Some of them are hobbyists and some of them are professional. The tradition of playing 'kusti' (wrestling) dates back to ancient age.
29	"Gaun Khane Katha"	May 1, 2019
A long-dated tradition of buying and selling whole village in Dom community in Southern plain of Nepal.
30	"Jhyaulika Juntara"	May 15, 2019
Stories of girls from Rolpa and Dang, working at a brick factory in Kathmandu.
31	"Mayako Katha"	June 1, 2019
A dog lover family in Kathmandu who have devoted everything they have for stray dogs and cats.
32	"Eauti Ketiko Katha"	June 15, 2019
We followed the life of Sehenaj Khatun from Kathmandu to her village in southern Nepal. Sehenaj has given birth to 8 children at the age of 22.
33	"Akashko Katha"	July 1, 2019
Stories of three paragliding pilots from Pokhara
34	"Ekadeshka Dakaharu"	July 15, 2019
The changed life story of Dushad community from southern Nepal, who were famous for robbery and thievery, some 40 years ago.
35	"Biteka Katha"	August 1, 2019
Stories of different characters who were involved in Maoist insurgency in Nepal.
36	"Eauta Yatrako Katha"	August 15, 2019
We took a challenging journey to Gobargada village in Eastern Nepal, a small island created by the Koshi River.
37	"Sangeetko Katha"	September 1, 2019
Stories of three different lives from Eastern Nepal who have befriended music. We met them at a music school run by Sunita Katwal in Itahari. Story of Music
38	"Sapanako Katha"	September 15, 2019
Chandranigahapur in southern Nepal is famous for its women's football team. Despite coming from poor families how the girls chased their dreams.
39	"Aaune Janeko Katha"	October 1, 2019
Eighteen years ago, a young Maoist boy disappeared from a battlefield.
40	"Ghumanteko Katha"	October 15, 2019
Story of a Shepherd and a Cowboy from Eastern Nepal who live a nomadic life for the sake of food for their cattle.
41	"Ruwako Katha"	November 1, 2019
A group of women from 33 to 72 years old, dream about performing a theater play. With no previous knowledge and experience on acting and theater, these women work hard for months. Finally they perform a play named ‘Ruwa (Cotton)'
42	"Maun Katha"	November 15, 2019
Stories of hearing impaired people from Eastern Nepal. Herne Katha Episode - 42 - Maun Katha (The Silent Story)
43	"Buwako Katha"	December 1, 2019
Story of Thaggu Chaudhary and his 3 year old daughter in Buwako Katha (A Father's Story)
44	"Panche Bajako Katha"	December 15, 2019
Men from 'Damai' community in Rukum, Western Nepal played a set of instruments called 'Panche Baja' (Five Instruments). Since the ancestors they played the music in different ceremonies in the community including weddings and funerals. However, people started quitting this traditional profession. One day, something happened...
45	"Baliyo Katha"	January 1, 2020
A strong Story - Baliyo Katha
46	"Taroko Katha"	January 15, 2020
Story of traditional archery in a village in Myagdi district, Gandaki Province, Nepal.
47	"Marphako Katha"	February 1, 2020
Story of Marpha village in Mustang, Nepal – exploring its unique historical traditions.
48	"Bhedi Gothko Katha"	February 15, 2020
Netra Magar from Myagdi District has more than 200 sheep. He always travels in the mountains with his herd.
49	"Geetko Katha"	March 1, 2020
A woman from Pokhara in her late 50s lives alone, sells milk and sings all the time.
50	"Bhariyako Katha"	March 17, 2020
Story of porters from Pathibhara temple in Taplejung, Nepal who carry pilgrims on their back to make living.
51	"The Man Who Died Once"	March 2, 2021
Two families from different parts of Nepal, unknown to each other, are connected by a fatal road accident in Saudi Arabia. 'Marisakeko Manchhe' (The Man Who Died Once) is a story of life and death, unimaginable sorrows, surprises and some measure of comfort and happiness.
52	"Senmikhako Katha"	March 16, 2021
Story of Senmikha, a young shepherd from Chakhewa, Bhojpur.
53	"Thakurniko Katha"	March 30, 2021
Story of Manjuliyadevi from Morang in Eastern Nepal, who inherited her husband's profession of traditional barber after his death.
54	"Simanta Katha"	April 13, 2021
Stories of people and villages in the mountains of Eastern Nepal bordering India.
55	"Lahureko Gaunko Katha"	April 27, 2021
Story of an abandoned village near Pokhara in Western Nepal.
56	"Matoko Katha"	May 11, 2021
Stories of Bhutanese refugees in Nepal who want to go back to their country.
57	"Paaniko Katha"	May 25, 2021
Extreme scarcity of drinking water in a small village in western Nepal. The story of water. Paaniko Katha.
58	"Koila Khaniko Katha"	June 8, 2021
Stories inside the tunnels of coal mines in the mountains bordering Dang and Rolpa district in the midwest Nepal. Koila Khaniko Katha - Story of Coal Mine.
59	"Ramailo Katha"	June 22, 2021
Story of folk musician from Eastern Nepal.
60	"Bhante ko Katha"	July 6, 2021
By the age of 20, Abadhesh didn't just drop out of his college, he left his family life too. Nowadays, he is seen in a Geru dress far away from his home. His friends don't call him as Abadhesh, brother anymore. He has become 'Bhikkhu Metteyya' now. Story of a Bhante from Lumbini.
61	"Bhadako Katha"	July 20, 2021
Story of a beautiful Tharu village, Bhada in Kailali district of western Nepal.
62	"Antareko Katha"	August 3, 2021
Story of a shepherd from Taplejung in Eastern Nepal.
63	"Ishwarko Katha"	August 17, 2021
Colorful story from Western plain of Nepal bordering India, where a boy named Ishwar dresses as a woman and dances in parties to make a living for his poor family.
64	"Narainapurko Katha"	August 31, 2021
Story of traditional Laathi Khel (Stick fighting) from Narainapur a small town bordering India in western plains of Nepal.
65	"Chehimko Katha"	September 14, 2021
Stories of old Limbu people from East Nepal who are prepared to die and celebrate death.
66	"Sol Kharkako Katha"	September 28, 2021
Story of a challenging journey to meet a couple who are herding buffaloes in the middle of an isolated forest on top of a hill near Pokhara, Kaski.
67	"Machhagaunko Katha"	October 12, 2021
Story of a 'Fish Village' in Bara, Bodhban. The villagers are switching to fish farming as it provides a higher return compared to other traditional farming.
68	"Asoj 5 ko Katha"	October 26, 2021
Most of the villagers in this part of Baglung (western hills), stay in hilly areas to feed their cattle for around 6 months. As the weather gets cold, they return to their village with their cattle's and belongings on the last week of September, to be exact, on 'Asoj 5.' This is the tradition that the villagers are following for decades. In this episode of Herne Katha, we have followed the villager's journey back to the village.
69	"Kabitako Katha"	November 9, 2021
Story of a cricketer's journey with some ups and downs.
70	"Gyan Sirko Katha"	November 23, 2021
Story of a dedicated teacher who has transformed a government school in his village into an exemplary school in the area.
71	"Sugandhi Katha"	December 7, 2021
Story of a happy family built of love, passion and struggle, from southern Nepal.
72	"Biheko Katha"	December 21, 2021
We followed a traditional wedding ceremony in a remote village in Jumla district, Karnali Province, in Western Nepal.
73	"Gaun Farkaneko Katha"	January 4, 2022
Story of an aspiring musician who left Kathmandu and started farming in his own village with like-minded friends.
74	"Seto Chini ko Katha"	January 18, 2022
We followed a mountain village to its journey to collect medicinal herb called Seto Chini, also known as Khiranglo and Hidde in local language.
75	"Lahureko Sapanako Katha"	February 1, 2022
Story of Deu Kumar Rai, an ex-British Gurkha, now following some dreams back in his home village in Eastern Nepal.
76	"Chefako Katha"	February 15, 2022
For many years, people in eastern Nepal are risking their lives to transport bamboo through Koshi (one of the largest rivers) and sell them in southern plains. One fine morning, Herne Katha team joined this adventurous river trip of villagers from Udaypur and witnessed the hardships, struggles and smiles of the bamboo rafters.
77	"Bauwako Katha"	March 1, 2022
Story of friendship, family and love: Bauwa- a tailor from Birgunj, Nepal.
78	"Doctor Gaun ko Katha"	March 15, 2022
A small Yadav settlement in Morang district in Eastern Nepal has produced nearly 30 doctors. How the village of farmers did this?
79	"Kulalbada Ko Katha"	March 29, 2022
Kulalbada, a small Dalit settlement near Jumla Bazar is changing slowly. The story of Kulalbada tells more.
80	"Giddako Katha"	April 12, 2022
Searching for the stories of vultures, we have travelled all around Pokhara. We, sometimes, travelled to the Seti river bank and sometimes, we waited for vultures at the vulture restaurant situated at Ghachowk.
81	"Sainoko Katha"	April 26, 2022
Story of an amazing relationship between Durga Paudel and Mala Tamang which started more than 30 years ago in a small village in Eastern Nepal.
82	"Dolpa Jane Batoko Katha"	May 10, 2022
We took an adventurous and difficult journey from Jumla to Dolpa in the Karnali region. Met people who have to walk for 2 days to reach Jumla from Dolpa.
83	"Tapuko Katha"	May 24, 2022
Life in small islands (Srilanka Tapu, Jampani Tapu) made by Koshi river in Eastern Nepal.
83	"Tapuko Katha"	May 24, 2022
Life in small islands (Srilanka Tapu, Jampani Tapu) made by Koshi river in Eastern Nepal.
84	"Harayeko Batoko Katha"	June 7, 2022
We have tried to explore the abandoned walking routes to Jomsom, Mustang. The trails used by trekkers, mules, and pilgrims have been replaced by motorable roads these days.
85	"Rubber ko Katha"	June 21, 2022
Rubber farming in Jhapa district in Eastern Nepal.
86	"Sangam ko Katha"	July 5, 2022
There is a group of people who have arrived in Pokhara with their own tales, they all sing songs; Songs of People.
87	"Bhote Gaun ko Katha"	July 19, 2022
People from 12 villages in northern Mugu have migrated to Jumla in search of a better life.
88	"Ama ko Katha"	August 2, 2022
Heart warming story of Gita Gautam, mother of more than 300 children.
89	"Julabi Chowk ko Katha"	August 18, 2022
No matter where life wanders, it is the memories that follow you.
90	"Mitho Katha"	September 2, 2022
story about a mother and her son, who, despite their bitter past experiences have rewritten their life story, filling it with infinite sweetness.
91	"Paani Magne Katha"	September 20, 2022
Six years ago, they faced a similar drought in the village. When it happened again this year, the villagers decided to pray for water.
92	"Baganko Katha"	October 4, 2022
Story about the people working in tea gardens in eastern Nepal.
93	"Sikaribasko Katha"	October 18, 2022
Story about Shikaribas, a village in southern Nepal surrounded by national parks and dense forest.
94	"Didi Bhai ko Katha"	October 27, 2022
After losing both their parents, three siblings in eastern Nepal had to learn how to be each other's guardians.
95	"Safar ko Katha"	November 15, 2022
Bagwana village is located at the edge of the forest, approximately 27 km from Birgunj metropolis. Every morning, two buses leave from the village to the city.
96	"Bahundangi ko Katha"	December 22, 2022
Story of years long conflict between humans and elephants in Bahundangi, Jhapa.
97	"Barekotko Katha"	January 5, 2023
Our destination was Mugu. But the weather had the last word. We changed our route after the rain washed away parts of the Karnali Highway. Barekot, the northern part of Jajarkot, became our new destination.
98	"Post-mortem ko Katha"	January 19, 2023
Vishwanath Harijan goes to the morgue alive.
99	"Jungle ko Katha"	February 2, 2023
A group of technicians are gearing up to enter the forests of Bardiya National Park. Their job is to count tigers.
100	"Ghanaghasyako Ukalo Feri Katda"	February 16, 2023
Half a century ago, Taranath Sharma walked from Jhulaghat, Baitadi to Dadeldhura. His account of this difficult journey, "Ghanaghasya ko Ukalo Katda" was also included in the older Nepali textbook.
101	"Kumaon ko Katha"	March 2, 2023
It has been generations since people left the mountains of sorrow in Nepal to find happiness in the mountains of India.
102	"Bagh ko Bangara"	March 25, 2023
High above the steep hills of Jajarkot, Nepal, four lives are tied together in the rugged cliffs of Khal Taakuri . Along the extreme topography of Nepal, and across the mental and emotional geographies of the tenacious human spirit, this documentary witnesses the perilous journey into the tiger’s jaw.
103	"Lauroko Katha"	April 8, 2023
Krishna Lawad from Dehimandu, Baitadi has an interesting but a tough profession. He goes deep into the forest to find sticks. With his inherited craftsmanship, he turns them into strong and beautiful walking sticks and sells them in the market.
104	"Durgamki Doctor ko Katha"	April 22, 2023
It takes two days of walking to reach the Pulu village of Karmarong; a remote village situated under the shadow of the lonely mountains in Mugu. Tulasi Shahi walked up these lonely mountains years ago, with a single purpose - to heal.
105	"Naya Katha"	May 6, 2023
A few years ago, while travelling through Dailekh, we were surrounded by little children from a nearby Badi community singing on the road. This time we could not find them on our way, so we headed towards their settlement - "The New Settlement". But, the old wounds still hurt the same.
106	"Ausadhiko Aspatal Yatra"	June 3, 2023
A motor road barely takes you from Mugu headquarters to a place called Chhayla. Even that is not possible in monsoon. The rations for 12 villages in Mugum Karmarong are then carried by either mules or humans. Lifesaving medicines also ride the mules.
107	"Rara ka Ghodchadhi"	July 1, 2023
Story of the young horse-riders at Rara Lake.
108	"Bandarle Lakheteka Gauharu"	July 15, 2023
Villages in Nepal are disappearing due to out-migration. While some people have left to chase their dreams, the others are driven away by compulsion. Villages near the Baitadi headquarters however, have been chased away by monkeys.
109	"Asafaltako Katha"	July 29, 2023
It's only fictional heroes in movies that are always successful. The life of a common person is sometimes a bed of roses, and sometimes full of thorns. Stories of success are often told, but who will tell the stories of failure?
110	"Aago, Aaran ra Aatmako Katha"	August 12, 2023
The story is a searing expose on the unfortunate, unacceptable and disgusting discrimination of the scheduled castes (Dalits) that still exists in the country.
111	"Tsum Valleyka Kathaharu"	August 26, 2023
Nestled between Ganesh Himal and Manaslu is a hidden valley, which until about 15 years ago, was closed off to foreigners. Tsum Valley is known for its mixture of Tibetan and Nepali ways of life. Our journey to Tsum Valley begins from Chhekong.
112	"The Last Village of Tsum Valley"	September 9, 2023
It snowed all night at Nile - the last human settlement in Tsum Valley. If you go a little further, you will find a monastery and then yak pastures and hills for harvesting Yarsagumba. If you keep going, you will stumble upon Tibetan villages that have become isolated by the snow.
113	"Phunjoko Katha"	October 21, 2023
Phunjo's story.
114	"Tadhako Gaun ko Katha"	November 11, 2023
We spent three days on the road before we reached Darchula's headquarters Khalanga from Kathmandu. From here, we still needed to go north - to Changru and Tinkar, villages at the border of China and India. However, there is no way to reach these villages through Nepal. One has to go through India. That is, if you are permitted by the Government of India. .
115	"Chhangru to Tinkar Pass"	December 3, 2023
In our previous episode, we travelled from Darchula’s headquarters to Chhangru village (elevation 3200 meters) near Kalapani. The villagers from Chhangru had one request for the country’s leaders: a trail road. Today, we are journeying even further - to the Tinkar village which sits at 3,800 meters, and then to the Nepal-China border at 5,300m.
116	"Dhunga ra Mayako Katha"	January 27, 2024
Story of a 17 year old girl from Kushbandhiya community in western Nepal.
117	"Kharideko Katha"	February 24, 2024
We traveled for 4 days from Bhojpur to Bange Bazar in Sunsari with buyers who collect cattle from the eastern hills of Nepal to sell them in the southern markets.
118	"Joge Loharka Chhora"	March 9, 2024
You do not know of Joge Lohar. Nobody knows him. Not even our country. Joge Lohar is one of the thousands of people in the Far West of Nepal who are forced to spend their entire youth in India just to make ends meet.
119	"Sundar Katha"	March 23, 2024
Story of 3 friends united for vegetable farming after returning from different countries.
120	"Pahadki Rani"	April 6, 2024
Story of a powerful single woman running a successful farm-house and tea garden in Eastern hills of Nepal.
121	"Samayako Katha"	June 15, 2024
Heroic tale of women recovering from drug addiction.
122	"Story of Mango"	July 14, 2024
Stories of mango farmers in southern Nepal.
123	"The Lost Years"	August 24, 2024
Around 1990, a young boy from Jhapa (Eastern Nepal) came to Kathmandu to weave Nepali carpets. After spending some time in Kathmandu, given that he is underage, the boy is laid off from his job. Some people from the Northern Gorkha found him. Assuring him a job as a cowherd, he was taken to Tsum Valley after a two-week walk. From there on, he never returned home from the Mountain..
124	"Gajendra, Gai ra Sapanaharu"	September 7, 2024
This is a story of Gajendra, a bit about a cow, and a bit about dreams.
125	"Belayatka Gham-Joon Haru"	September 21, 2024
In Aldershot, United Kingdom, British war veterans and widows from Nepal.
126	"Aashako Katha"	October 5, 2024
Can a fallen person get up? Can a person who is defeated by life.
127	"Kalkatiyawaliko Katha"	October 19, 2024
Stories of people behind a very popular Maithili YouTube Comedy show Kalkatiywali.
128	"Thade Gaunka Mitko"	November 2, 2024
When Ben first arrived in Nepal in 1976, he was an 18-year-old teenager. He was interested in archaeology. After Iraq refused him a visa, he followed the hippies to Nepal. The memories of that time are like the flickering light of a candle. Since then, Ben has been to Nepal many times. He did his PhD by studying the economic and social aspects of a Tamang village in Rasuwa.
129	"The Hulaki Highway"	November 16, 2024
We followed the Postal Highway of Nepal along the southern plains of the country witnessing the stories of people and villages that are changed and unchanged by the road.
130	"Buduko Katha"	November 30, 2024
Visiting Budu village feels as though we have travelled back in time.
131	"Mugu Bhitrako Mugu ko Katha"	December 14, 2024
Mugu village is inside Mugu district. The last village. From Pulu, the village headquarter of Mugum Karmarong, we started our journey towards Mugu village.
132	"Sapanaka Suitcaseharu"	December 28, 2024
On a sunny day in July, a quiet corner in the east side of London feels empty. You can't hear the usual hustle and bustle of the city. Here, dreams from different parts of Nepal come together under the same roof.
133	"Sun Falne Deshma"	January 11, 2025
Stories about Nepali/Gurkha in Assam, India.
134	"The Farmers of Scotland"	January 25, 2025
About 50 kilometers from Edinburgh, the capital of Scotland, is a market called Kirkcaldy. Near the market is the estate village of Coaltown of Wemyss. In the fields nearby that stretch for miles and miles, sometimes you get to see wheat swaying in the wind, sometimes mustard blooming and turning the hills yellow. Here and there, cattle are seen grazing in the green pastures.
135	"The Land Beyond the Clouds"	February 8, 2025
This is Meghalya, home of the clouds. 10 years ago, when the coal mines got shut down, the Nepali workers moved away in search of other opportunities. Some returned back to Nepal. Some, who stayed behind, can be found guarding the dry hills of Meghalaya.
136	"The Story of Nepal Railway"	February 22, 2025
The Story of Nepal Railway
137	"Belayatka Nepali Tara"	March 8, 2025
Professor Dr. Gopal Sapkota, who leads an important laboratory at Dandai University that supports the treatment of diseases like cancer. Ruby Raut, who came to the UK on a student visa and is now producing sanitary pads for menstruation.
138	"The American Dream"	March 22, 2025
What connects the remote villages of Rukum to the United States of America that lies beyond the Atlantic Ocean? Dreams.
139	"Jatra London Ko"	April 5, 2025
Following the Nepali community in London, showing how they celebrate traditional Nepali festivals and rituals far from home.
140	"Finding Juntara"	April 19, 2025
Almost 6 years ago we met 13-year-old Juntara in the shed of a brick kiln in Kathmandu. When we reached Rolpa 6 years later, we wanted to find Juntara.
141	"Bagar ko Katha"	May 3, 2025
During the British Colonization, indigenous people from Jharkhand, India were transported in trucks and tractors to work in the tea plantations of Assam and West Bengal in North-East India. They, who left their soil, cultivated treasures in these gardens. Generations passed.
142	"Gulmi Express:"	May 17, 2025
In the heart of Perth, Scotland, there is a hotel called Grampian. Outside the hotel, along with the flags of England and Scotland, the Nepali flag is also flying. The hotel, named after the Grampian mountain range in Scotland, is owned by Kashiram Bhandari.
143	"Kokrajhar ko Katha"	May 31, 2025
Those who went to raise cattles in Assam probably chose water and forest. Some people came down from Bhutan following the Sarbang River. Some arrived from Nepal. In a place called Khalasi in Kokrajhar district, people who raise cattles are still found in the middle of the forest.
144	"Icefall Doctors"	June 14, 2025
Before the climbing season begins in the spring, Mount Everest and its foothills have already endured a season of rain and winter. The paths traveled the previous year have disappeared. The journey to the summit has become uncertain. In that uncertainty, the icefall doctor takes the first step.
145	"The Wild FLowers"	June 28, 2025
The poignant story of two elderly sisters, Bhimala and Lalima, who live a quiet, self-sufficient life deep in the hills of Nepal. Isolated from modern society, they embody resilience, simplicity, and a deep bond with nature, symbolizing how beauty and strength can bloom even in the remotest corners—like wildflowers in the forest.
146	"Three Stories of War"	July 12, 2025
Three different stories from Rolpa about the Maoist insurgency.
147	"Mustang to Dolpo"	July 26, 2025
This time we decided to travel to Upper Dolpa, via the Mustang route.
148	"Amlighat ko Katha"	August 9, 2025
About 65 kilometers east of Guwahati, the capital of Assam, a Nepali settlement is found along the highway. The name of the place is Amlighat. Amlighat is famous for its cowherds. The Kapili River is not far from here. But nowadays, cows do not disappear beyond the Kapili River as in Bhupen Hazarika's song. It has been years since the people here stopped raising cows by living in the forests.
149	"Chharka Bhot ko Katha"	August 23, 2025
Stories from Chharka Bhot in Dolpo region, one of the highest human settlements in the world.
150	"Tusa ko Katha"	September 20, 2025
For forty days of the monsoon, the dense forests beneath Machhapuchhre open their secret bounty—tender cane shoots. At the break of midnight, gatherers rise, braving leeches and bears, climbing into the steep thickets where the fragile shoots hide
151	"Ujyalo Assam"	October 4, 2025
Along the banks of the Brahmaputra in Assam, the Gorkhas carry memories of mountains and migration. Their past still lives in their hearts, but now, they are shaping their own present.
152	"Tsum ko Chalan"	October 18, 2025
In Himalayan regions like the Tsum Valley, where cultivable land is scarce, brothers traditionally shared a single wife to avoid dividing their property. Although this practice was once common, it is now slowly disappearing with increasing contact with the outside world.
153	"Tetang ko Katha"	November 1, 2025
Once upon a time, the people of Tetang village used to lend money to the entire Mustang region. These days, people have slowly started migrating away. Like other Himalayan villages, snowfall has stopped here too, and the natural water springs are beginning to dry up.
154	"Tinje ko Katha"	November 15, 2025
After finishing our stay at Charka Bhot, we headed towards Tinje, another human settlement in Upper Dolpa.
155	"Jaat Sodhnu Bakhrako"	November 29, 2025
While traveling along the postal highway, we saw large huts on the side of the road near Rangeli in Morang. When we looked closer, we realized that they were modern goat farms.
156	"The Porters of Khumbu"	December 13, 2025
Perhaps the sighs and fatigue of the porters here are fading away amidst the beautiful photos of the mountains, the exciting stories of the Khumbu trek, and the dozens of names and records of climbing.
157	"Pahadma Sun Falauneharu"	December 27, 2025
Dhankuta's oranges have been fetching a gold price for a long time now. Nowadays, this orange city has started to create a new identity - the capital of avocados.
158	"Mailo Bajeko Kalo Maya"	January 10, 2026
In a quiet corner of Hetauda, a blind motorcycle mechanic and his family keep life moving with love, labor, and resilience.
159	"Dho, Aamchi and Yarsa"	January 24, 2026
From Dunai, the district headquarters, it takes two days of tightly clinging to riverbeds and cliff-hugging trails to reach the Dho Valley. Perched at an altitude of 4,100 meters, Dho is regarded as the gateway to Upper Dolpo.
160	"Danako Katha"	February 7, 2026
Locally, rudraksha is known as dana. In the months of Kartik and Mangsir, the hills of Bhojpur and Sankhuwasabha are filled with it. Dana in the fields, dana in sacks, dana laid out to dry, dana at doorsteps, dana in small bags—dana everywhere.
161	"Dehatka Guru"	February 21, 2026
A remote rural corner of Dhanusha. On one side stretch the vast sandy banks and grasslands of the Kamala River; a little farther lies the Indian border. Far from towns, markets, and main roads — Kathal village of Janak Nandini Rural Municipality. In this distant village, Sanjay Yadav is slowly spreading a little light.
162	"Magantaka Katha"	March 21, 2026
In a few villages around Nepalgunj, the Maganta community is known for an occupation passed down through generations — begging.
163	"Hetauda Kapada Udhyogko Katha"	April 4, 2026
The Hetauda Textile Industry, established in 1976 (2033 BS) with Chinese assistance, once provided employment to around 1,200 people. Among the hundreds of hands that helped lay its foundation were those of Prakash Paudel. Having spent 23 years working there as a laborer, today we walk through the same Hetauda Textile Industry with him, revisiting its past and present.
164	"Story of the Old Tiger"	April 18, 2026
Bishnu Bahadur Lama and Harkaman Lama lived in Toplang village near Chitlang. They came from a family of hunters. Both their grandfather and father were hunters for the royal palace. From time to time, they had to hunt birds and deliver them to the palace. Vishnu and Hark grew up watching their father and grandfather handle guns.
165	"Chharka School and Sonam"	May 2, 2026
Perhaps beautiful souls are meant for difficult places. Just as the rhododendron blooms on rugged slopes and wildflowers thrive in the cold meadows, so do people like Tshiring Samdup and Sonam Bhuti—blossoming in the heart of the Himalayas..
166	"Story of PHD Farmer"	May 16, 2026
In Madi, Chitwan, Bhaneshwor has created an inspiring farm while pursuing his dreams. Come, let’s listen to the story of this PhD farmer.
