= Rara snowtrout =

Conservation status
- Critically Endangered (IUCN 3.1)

Scientific classification
- Kingdom: Animalia
- Phylum: Chordata
- Class: Actinopterygii
- Order: Cypriniformes
- Family: Cyprinidae
- Subfamily: Schizothoracinae
- Genus: Schizothorax
- Species: S. raraensis

Binomial name
- Schizothorax raraensis Terashima, 1984

Species of fish

The Rara snowtrout (Schizothorax raraensis), is a cyprinid fish species of the genus Schizothorax. The Rara snowtrout was first collected in 1979 in the alpine fresh water Rara Lake located in Nepal's Rara National Park.
