= Bulbule Lake =

Lake in Karnali Province, Nepal

- बुलबुले ताल (Nepali)
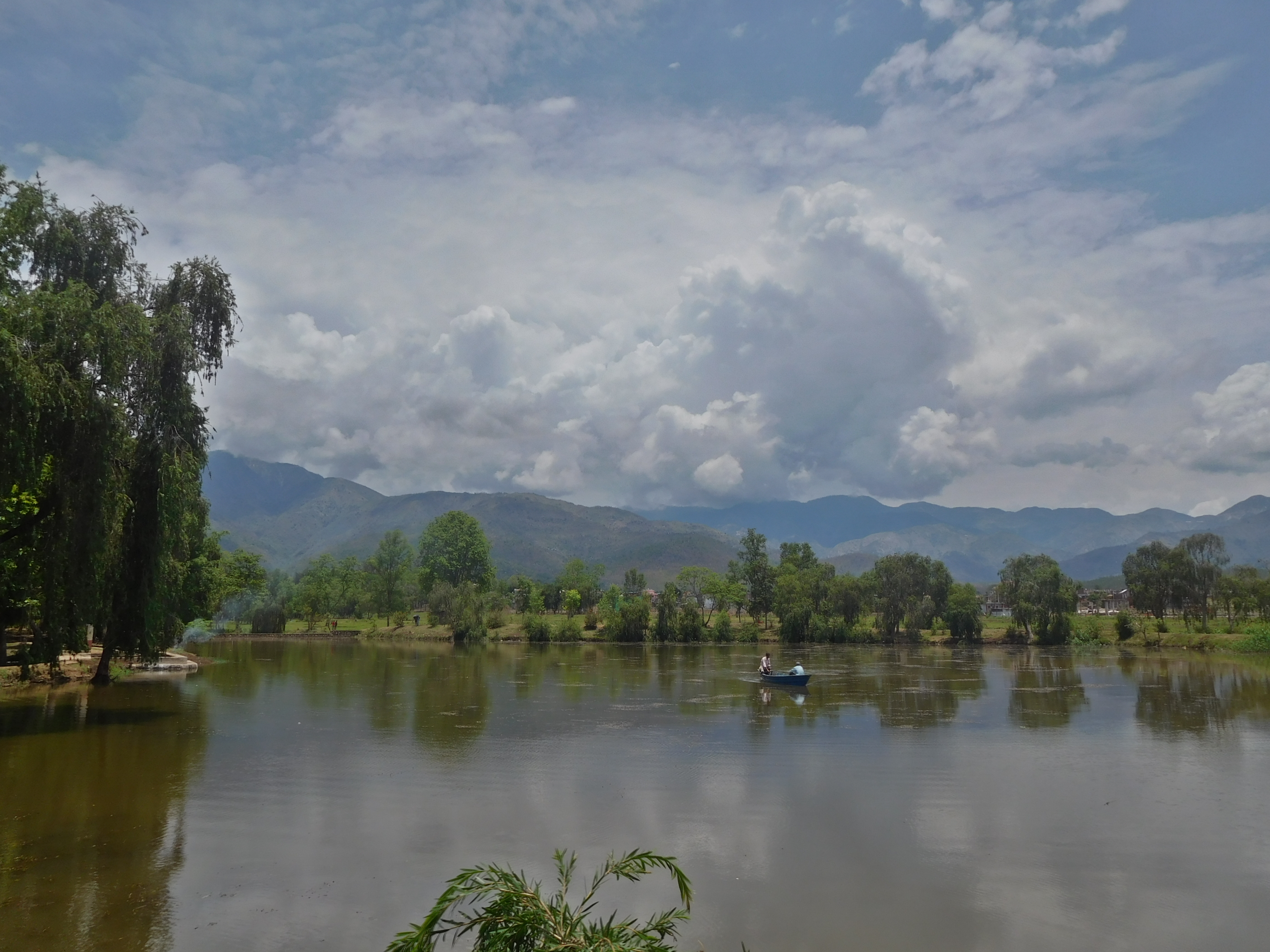
- Bulbule Lake in 2016

- Bulbule Lake in Karnali Province Bulbule Lake (Nepal)
- Interactive map of Bulbule Lake
- Location: Birendranagar, Karnali Province, Nepal
- Coordinates: 28°34′53″N 81°37′10″E
- Type: Lake

Bulbule Lake (Nepali: बुलबुले ताल) is a lake in Birendranagar, Karnali Province, Nepal. Bulbule lake owes its name to the way water bubbles from its spring, before it can be seen emanating from a series of stone spouts.

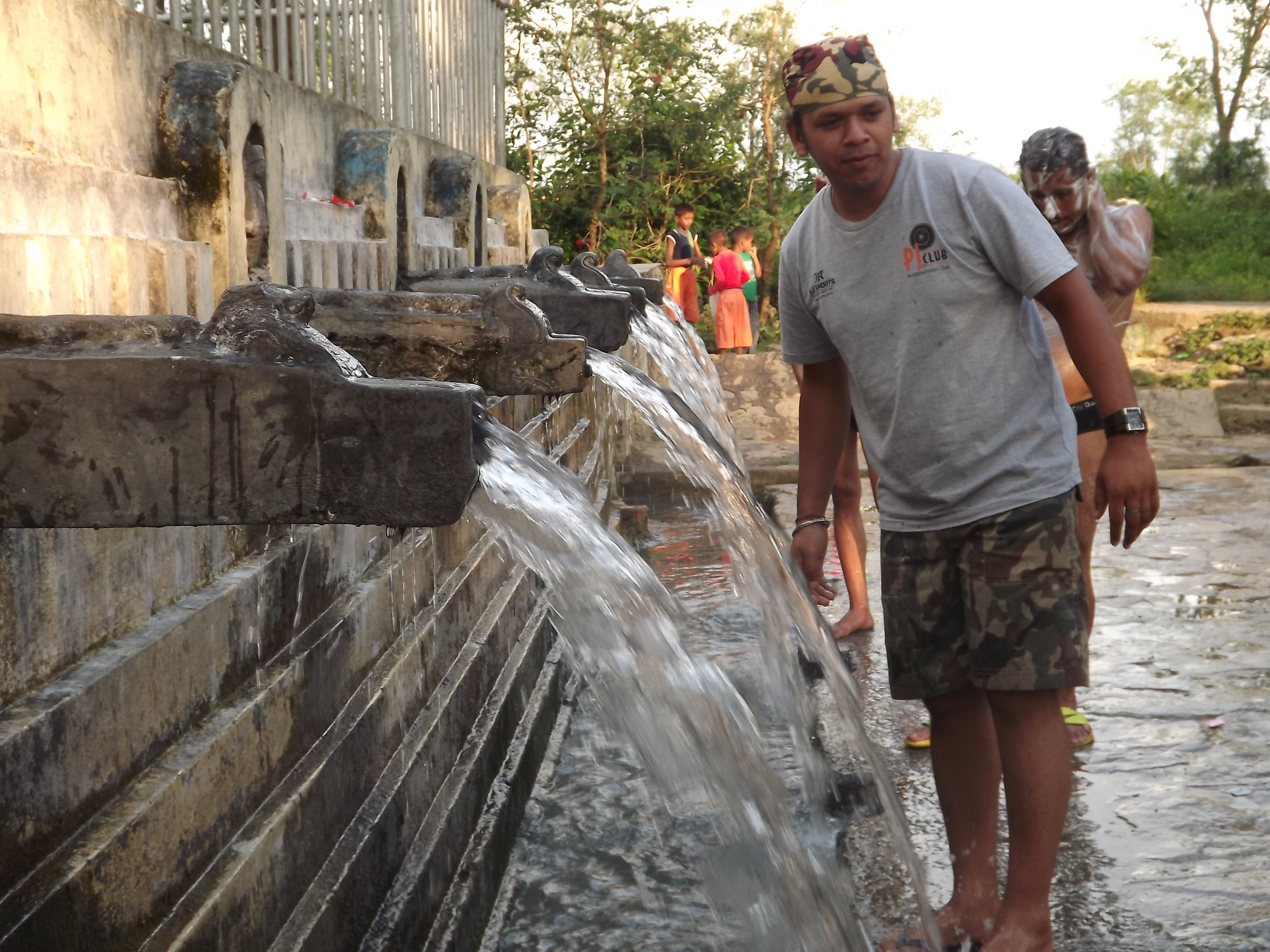
Stone spouts at Bulbule Lake

Bulbule Lake is currently undergoing an expansion project; it will be expanded from 12,000 meters square to 28,500 meters square. The expansion will cost about 20 million Nepalese rupees.

The Nepali song "Surkhetma Bulbule Taal" was inspired by this lake and parts of the song were filmed in the Bulbule Lake.
