= List of natural monuments in Nepal =

The Natural Monuments of Nepal includes mountains, rivers, lakes, waterfalls, national parks, wildlife reserves, bird sanctuary, land terraces and flood way. The Nepal Nature Conservation Act 1982 (Raastriya Praakrtik Sanrakshan Kosh Ain 2039 BS) was made to protect and develop the Natural Monuments of Nepal. The monument list below is populated using the authentic information at Ministry of Forests and Environment.

== Mountains in Nepal ==
Nepal contains part of the Himalayas, the highest mountain range in the world. Eight of the fourteen eight-thousanders are located in the country and the highest mountain in the world, Mount Everest.

| Mountain/Peak | metres | feet | Section | Notes | Photo |
|---|---|---|---|---|---|
| Mount Everest | 8,848 | 29,029 | Khumbu Mahalangur | Earth's highest from sea level | |
| Kanchenjunga | 8,586 | 28,169 | Northern Kangchenjunga | 3rd highest on Earth | |
| Lhotse | 8,516 | 27,940 | Everest Group | 4th highest | |
| Makalu | 8,463 | 27,766 | Makalu Mahalangur | 5th highest | |
| Cho Oyu | 8,201 | 26,906 | Khumbu Mahalangur | 6th highest | |
| Dhaulagiri I | 8,167 | 26,795 | Dhaulagiri | 7th highest | |
| Manaslu | 8,156 | 26,759 | Mansiri | 8th highest | |
| Annapurna I | 8,091 | 26,545 | Annapurna | 10th highest | |

== National Parks of Nepal ==
Nepal has 12 national parks. Chitwan National Park is the first national park in Nepal established in 1973.

| Name | Photo | Location | Date formed | Area |
|---|---|---|---|---|
| Chitwan National Park | | Nawalparasi, Parsa, Chitwan and Makwanpur; 27°30′N 84°20′E | 1973 | 932 km^{2} (360 sq mi) |
| Sagarmatha National Park | | Solukhumbu District; 27°56′N 86°44′E | July 19, 1976 | 1,148 km^{2} (443 sq mi) |
| Langtang National Park | | Nuwakot, Rasuwa and Sindhulpalchok; 28°17′N 85°55′E | 1976 | 1,710 km^{2} (660 sq mi) |
| Rara National Park | | Mugu and Jumla; 29°30′N 82°03′E | 1976 | 106 km^{2} (41 sq mi) |
| Khaptad National Park | | Bajhang, Bajura, Achham and Doti; 29°16′N 80°59′E | 1984 | 225 km^{2} (87 sq mi) |
| Shey Phoksundo National Park | | Dolpa and Mugu; 29°21′N 82°50′E | 1984 | 3,555 km^{2} (1,373 sq mi) |
| Bardiya National Park | | Bardiya District; 28°23′N 81°30′E | 1988 | 968 km^{2} (374 sq mi) |
| Makalu Barun National Park | | Solukhumbu and Sankhuwasabha; 27°45′N 87°06′E | 1992 | 1,500 km^{2} (580 sq mi) |
| Shivapuri Nagarjun National Park | | Kathmandu, Nuwakot and Sindhupalchowk; 27°47′N 85°23′E | 2002 | 159 km^{2} (61 sq mi) |
| Banke National Park | | Banke, Salyan and Dang; 28°19′N 81°54′E | 12 July 2010 | 550 km^{2} (210 sq mi) |
| Shuklaphanta National Park | | Kanchanpur District; 28°50′N 80°13′E | 1976 (2017 - National Park) | 305 km^{2} (118 sq mi) |
| Parsa National Park | | Parsa, Makwanpur and Bara; 27°28′N 84°20′E | 1984 | 637 km^{2} (246 sq mi) |

== Conservation areas in Nepal ==
Nepal has six conservation areas.

| Name | Photo | Location | Area |
|---|---|---|---|
| Annapurna Conservation Area | | Manang, Mustang, Kaski, Myagdi and Lamjung | 7,629 km^{2} (2,946 sq mi) |
| Kanchenjunga Conservation Area | | Taplejung District | 2,035 km^{2} (786 sq mi) |
| Manaslu Conservation Area | | Gorkha District | 1,663 km^{2} (642 sq mi) |
| Blackbuck Conservation Area | | Bardiya | 15.95 km^{2} (6.16 sq mi) |
| Api Nampa Conservation Area | | Darchula | 1,903 km^{2} (735 sq mi) |
| Gaurishankar Conservation Area | | Ramechhap, Dolakha and Sindhupalchok | 2,179 km^{2} (841 sq mi) |
