= Sajha Sawal =

- Also known as: Sajha Sawal
- Genre: Weekly Debate Programme
- Created by: BBC Media Action
- Country of origin: Nepal
- Original language: Nepali
- No. of episodes: 529

Production
- Producer: BBC Media Action
- Production locations: Sanepa, Lalitpur, Nepal
- Editor: Kiran Bhandari
- Running time: 45 minutes

Original release
- Network: Kantipur Television
- Release: November 2007 – January 2018

Sajha Sawal (Nepali: साझा सवाल) was a weekly debate program broadcast across Nepal on radio and TV. The program was usually based on current affairs. In its eight years of broadcast, the program had been shot in 69 of the 75 districts of Nepal. Representatives of the different sections of society, related to the topic of debate are brought together during the program to discuss and find a solution to the issue. And as the name of the program speaks for itself, the program is an opportunity for people to raise questions and put them before the authorities.

Sajha Sawal was a popular show among the Nepali community, reaching out to 6.6 million viewers, according to a research conducted by BBC Media Action. The show is appreciated for its impartial take on different social issues.

== History ==
The program's first episode aired in November 2007. It began with the interview of former (late) Prime Minister Girija Prasad Koirala. The interview as shot in Koirala's hometown in Biratnagar. It was the first such program, where members of the public were allowed to ask questions to a sitting prime minister. Women, Dalits, and Muslims were able to directly ask questions on the peace process, constitution, election and other political issues.

== See also ==
- BBC Nepali
- BBC Media Action
