= Syarpu lake =

Natural lake in Nepal

- स्यार्पु ताल (Nepali)
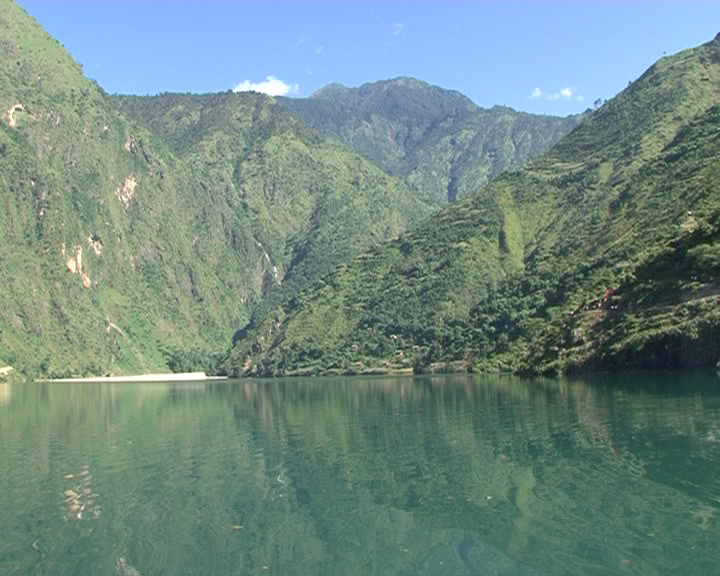
- View of Syarpu lake

- Location within Nepal
- Location: Rukum, Nepal
- Coordinates: 28.6969°N 82.4758°E
- Designation: Lake
- Surface elevation: 1,372 metres (4,501 ft)
- Settlements: banphikot(rukum)

Syarpu lake (Nepali: स्यार्पु ताल)is located in Rukum district of western Nepal at an altitude of 1372 m. The surface area of the lake is about 2.6 km^{2}. The lake drains to the Bheri River. The lake is used for high-altitude fish farming.

To promote tourism in the area, an observation tower was constructed by Nepal Army at a cost of NPR 500,000.

Due to human encroachment and several landslides the area of the land was found to be decreasing. Construction of a ring road around the lake have also degraded the lake.

== See also ==
- List of lakes of Nepal
