= Rara National Park =

National park in Mugu and Jumla, Nepal

- Nepali: रारा राष्ट्रिय निकुञ्ज
- IUCN category II (national park)
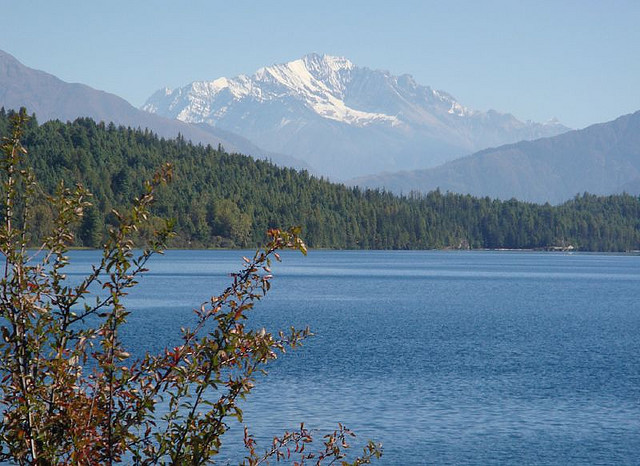
- Rara Lake

- Location within Karnali Province Location within Nepal
- Location: Nepal
- Nearest city: Jumla
- Coordinates: 29°30′N 82°04′E
- Area: 106 km^{2} (41 sq mi)
- Established: 1976
- Governing body: Department of National Parks and Wildlife Conservation

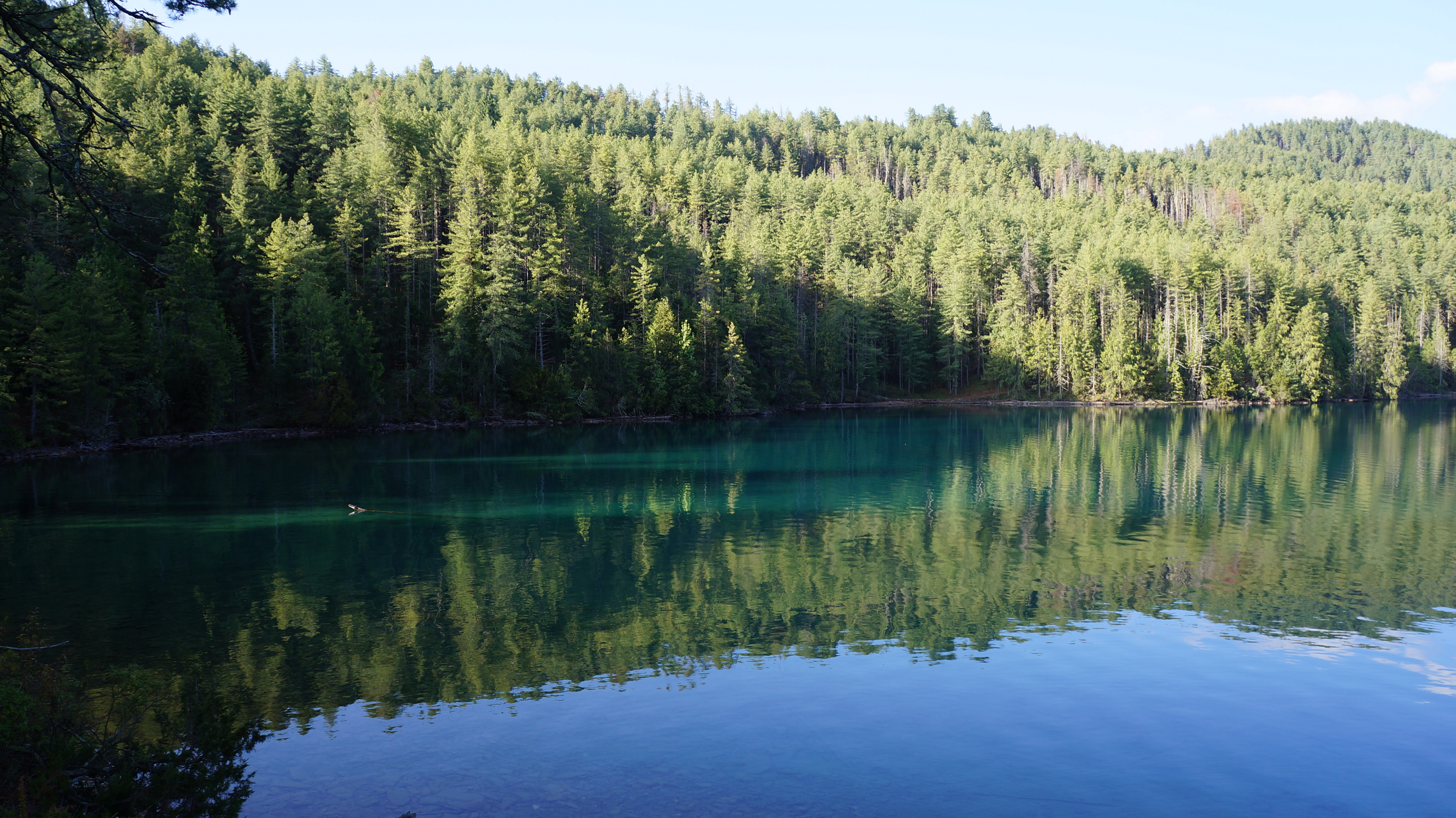
Northern shore of Rara Lake

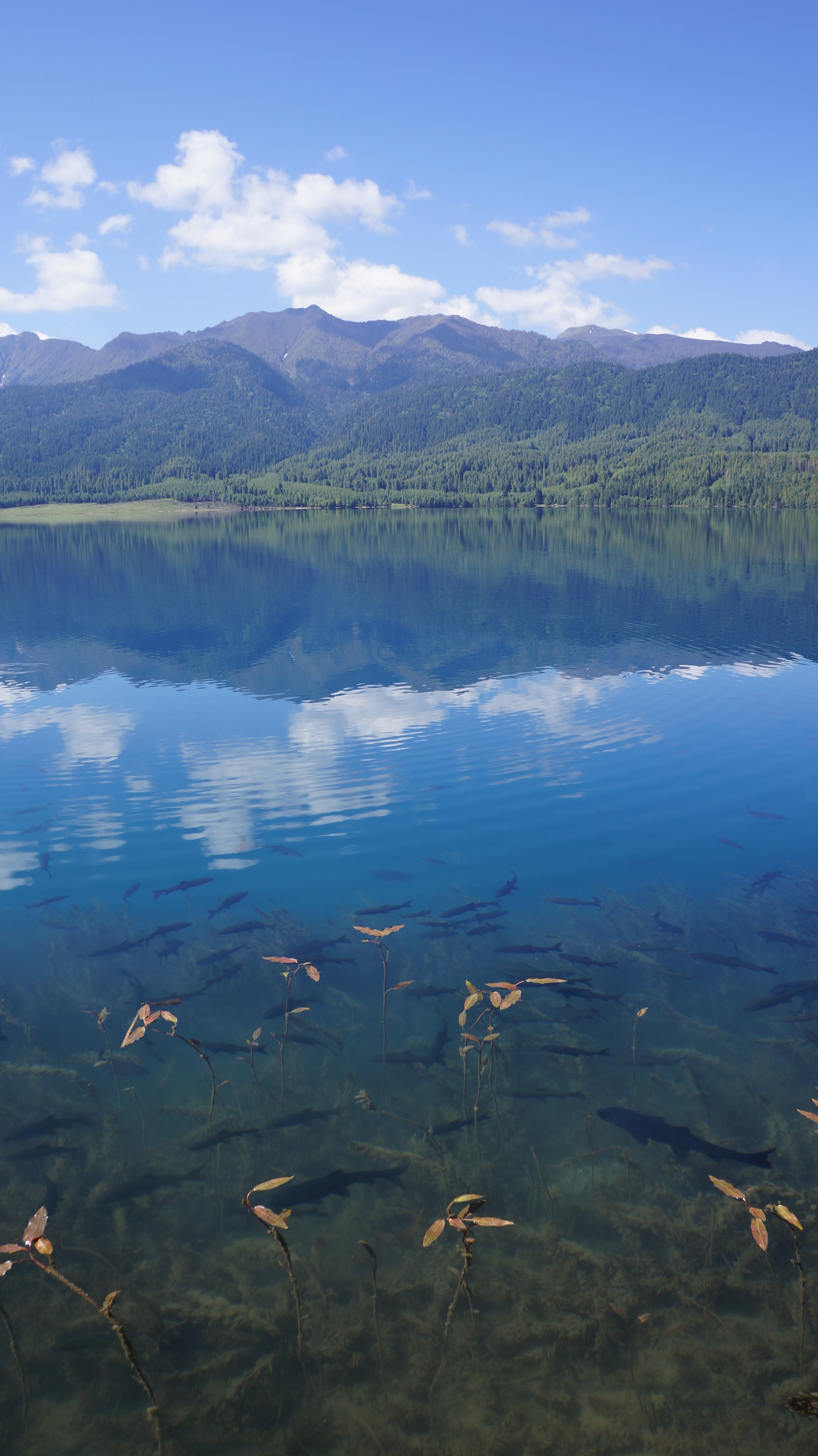
Fish in Rara Lake

Rara National Park is a national park in the Himalayas of Nepal and was established in 1976. With an area of 106 km^{2} (41 sq mi) in the Mugu and Jumla districts, it is the country's smallest national park. It ranges from 2,800 to 4,039 m (9,186 to 13,251 ft) at Chuchemara Peak; the peaks of Ruma Kand and Malika Kand frame Rara Lake at 2,990 m (9,810 ft), which is the largest lake in Nepal with a surface of 10.8 km^{2} (4.2 sq mi) and a maximum depth of 167 m (548 ft). It is oval-shaped with an east–west axis, a length of 5 km (3.1 mi) and a width of 3 km (1.9 mi) draining into the Mugu-Karnali River via Nijar Khola.

== Climate ==
The summer is warm, but June to August is monsoon season, making the trek to Rara National Park difficult.

== Wildlife ==
Rara National Park is rich in flora and fauna, with 1,070 plant species known to occur in the park. The vegetation is generally temperate and subalpine, and is dependent on the elevation. Below 3,200 m (10,500 ft), the vegetation consists of mainly blue pine (Pinus excelsa), rhododendron (Rhododendron arboretum), west Himalayan spruce, black juniper and Himalayan cypress. Above 3,200 m (10,500 ft), the vegetation changes to a coniferous forest consisting of a mixture of fir, spruce and pine.

=== Fauna ===
51 species of mammals reside in the park including musk deer, Himalayan black bear, Indian leopard, jackal, Himalayan tahr, yellow-throated marten, otter, dhole, gray langur, rhesus macaque, and red panda.

There are 241 recorded species of birds, including 49 wetland species. Coots are often found in the lake. During the winter, great-crested and black-necked grebes, red-crested pochards, mallard, common teal (Anas crecca), and common merganser are common. Other birds seen often include the Himalayan snowcock, chukar partridge, Himalayan monal, kalij pheasant and blood pheasant.

In 1979, three endemic snowtrout species were collected in Lake Rara and described as new species: the Nepalese snowtrout Schizothorax nepalensis, the Rara snowtrout, and Nepalese snowtrout. In 1979, the frog species Paa rarica has been first recorded as endemic to the lake.

== Environmental issues ==
Due to over-grazing and defecation, the national park conservation officers are facing a challenge to preserve the lake. Local people are cutting timber and fuel wood, which is a problem for conservation of Rara. Also during festivals visitors and local people produce a lot of wastage causing water pollution.
