= Rara Lake =

Lake in Nepal

- रारा ताल/महेन्द्र दह (Nepali)
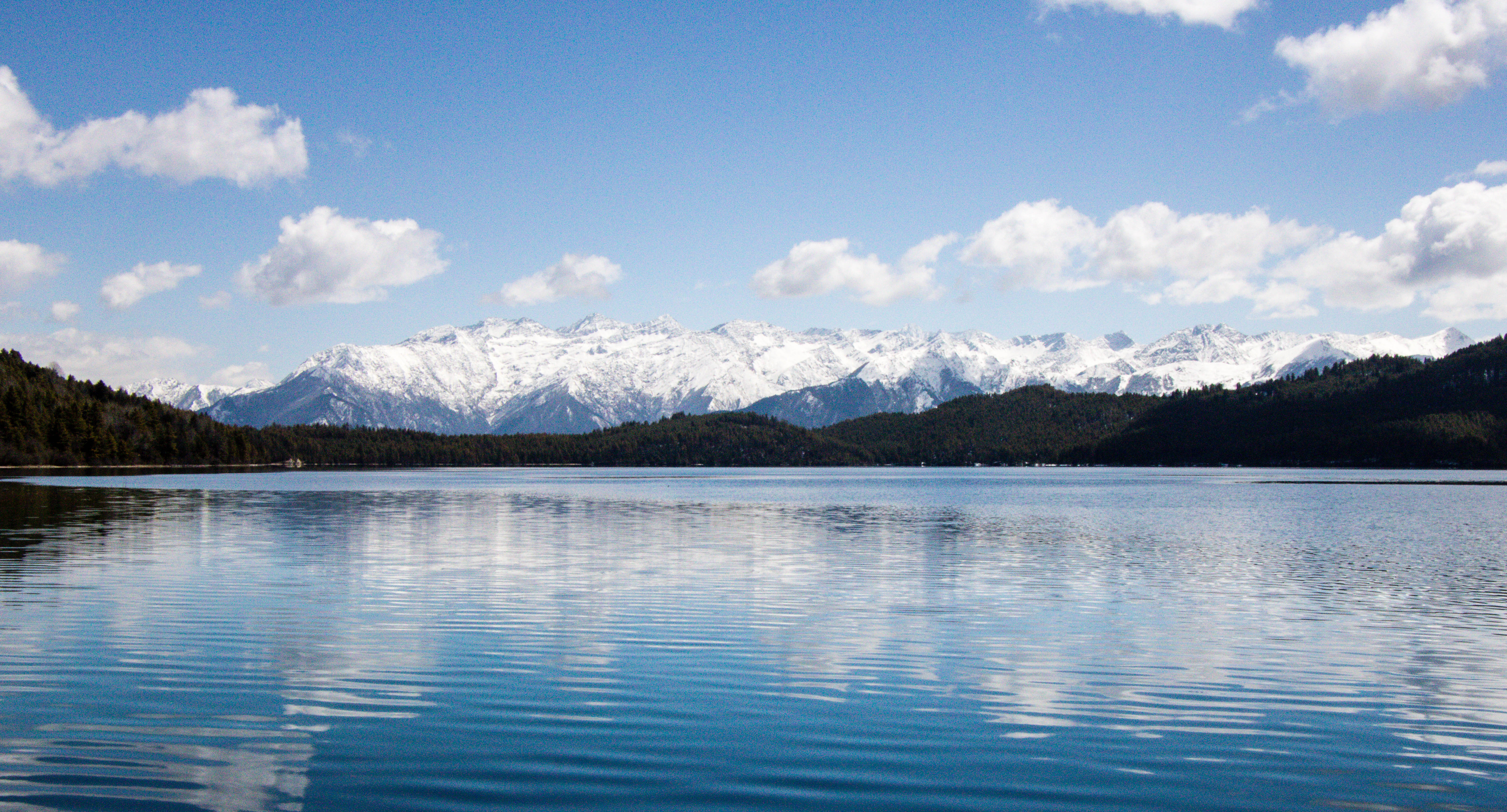
- View of Rara lake

- Location within Karnali Province Location within Nepal Location within South Asia
- Interactive map of Rara Lake
- Location: Mugu District, Karnali Province
- Coordinates: 29°31′45″N 82°5′35″E
- Type: fresh water
- Part of: Rara National Park
- Primary inflows: small rivulets
- Primary outflows: Nijar River
- Basin countries: Nepal
- Max. length: 5.1 km (3.2 mi)
- Max. width: 2.7 km (1.7 mi)
- Surface area: 10.61 km^{2} (4.10 sq mi)
- Average depth: 100 m (330 ft)
- Max. depth: 167 m (548 ft)
- Water volume: 1.07 km^{3} (0.26 cu mi)
- Shore length^{1}: 14 km (8.7 mi)
- Surface elevation: 2,990 m (9,810 ft)
- Frozen: December–March
- Website: https://dnpwc.gov.np/en/conservation-area-detail/73

Ramsar Wetland
- Designated: 23 September 2007
- Reference no.: 1695
- ^{1} Shore length is not a well-defined measure.

Rara Lake is the largest fresh water lake in the Nepalese Himalayas and located in Jumla and Mugu Districts of Karnali Province. It is part of Rara National Park, which covers an area of 106 km^{2} (41 sq mi).

== History ==
Rara Lake was included as part of Rara National Park in 1976. In 1976, citizens of the two villages Chapra and Rara were resettled to Nepalgunj. In September 2007, it was declared as a Ramsar site, covering 1,583 ha (6.11 sq mi) including the surrounding wetland. Rara National Park is protected by the Nepali Army.

== Geography ==
Rara Lake lies at an elevation of 2,975 m (9,760 ft), has a water surface of 10.8 km^{2} (4.2 sq mi), a maximum depth of 167 m (548 ft), is 5.1 km (3.2 mi) long and 2.7 km (1.7 mi) wide. It drains into the Mugu Karnali River via the Nijar River. The lake changes its colour up to five times a day depending on the climate.

== Wildlife ==
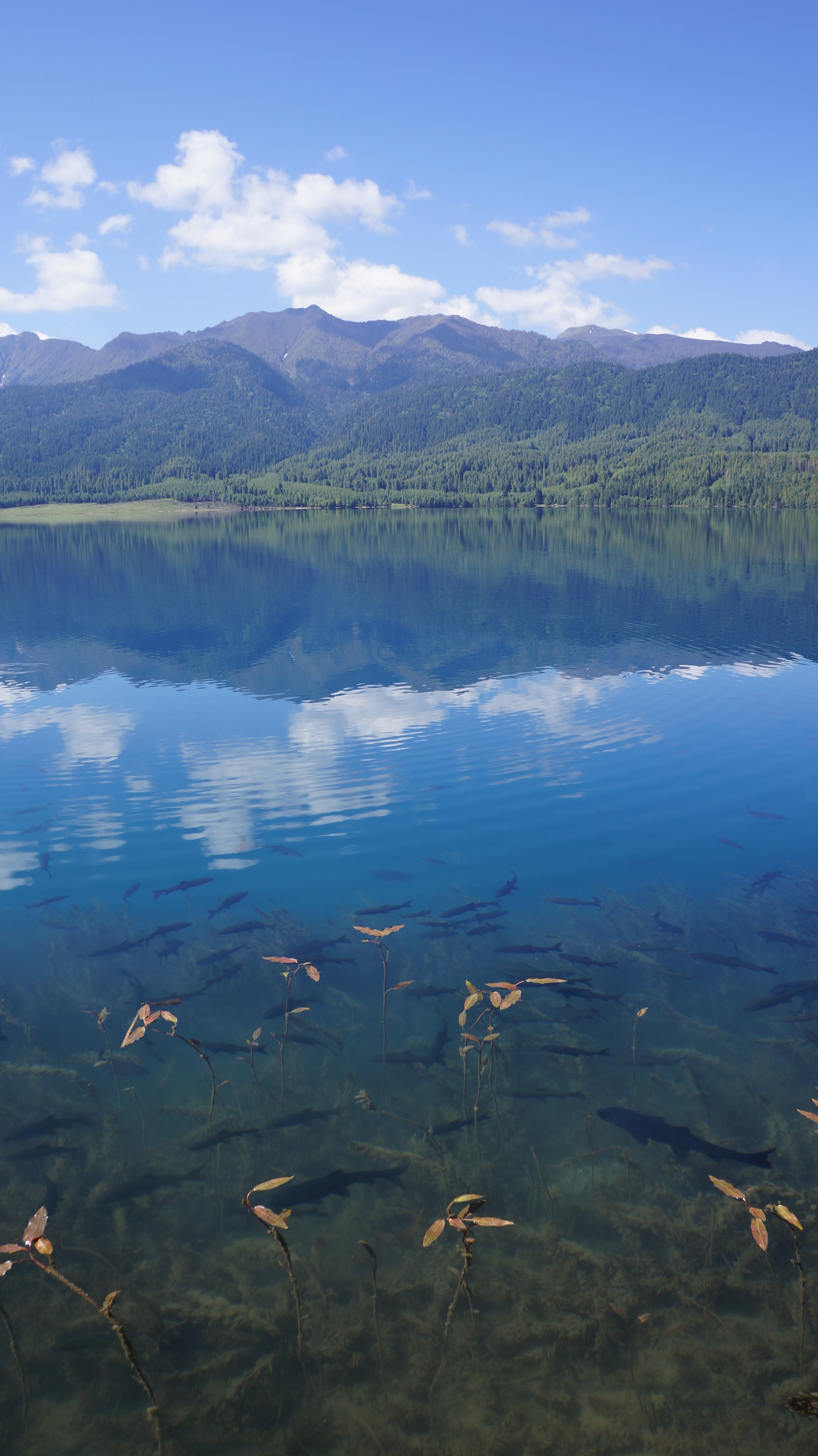
Fish in clear water of Rara Lake

The Rara snowtrout (Schizothorax raraensis) is endemic to Rara Lake. The lake also holds the Nepalese snowtrout (S. macrophthalmus), (S. nepalensis); and one endemic frog, the Rara Lake frog (Nanorana rarica).

== Climate ==
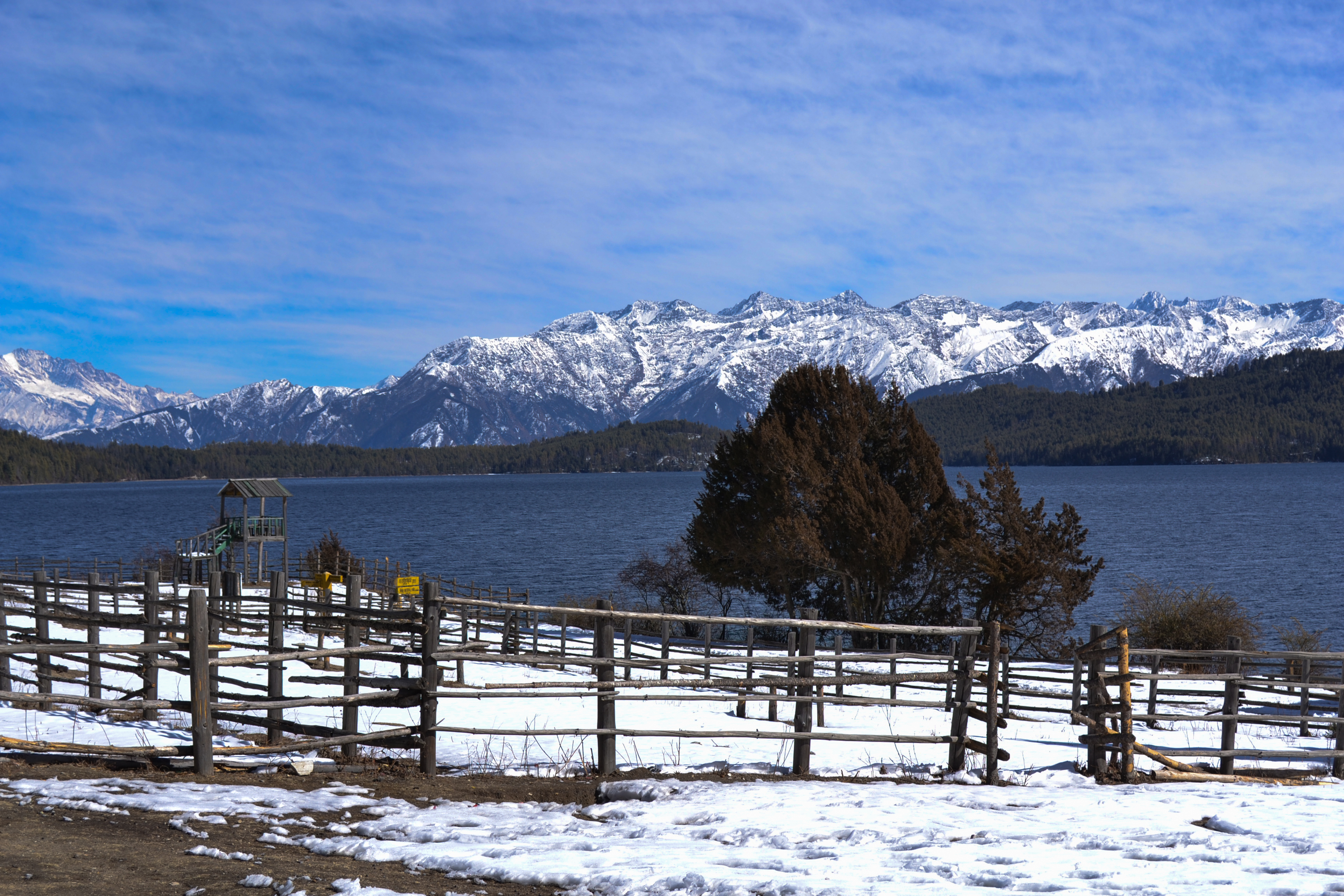
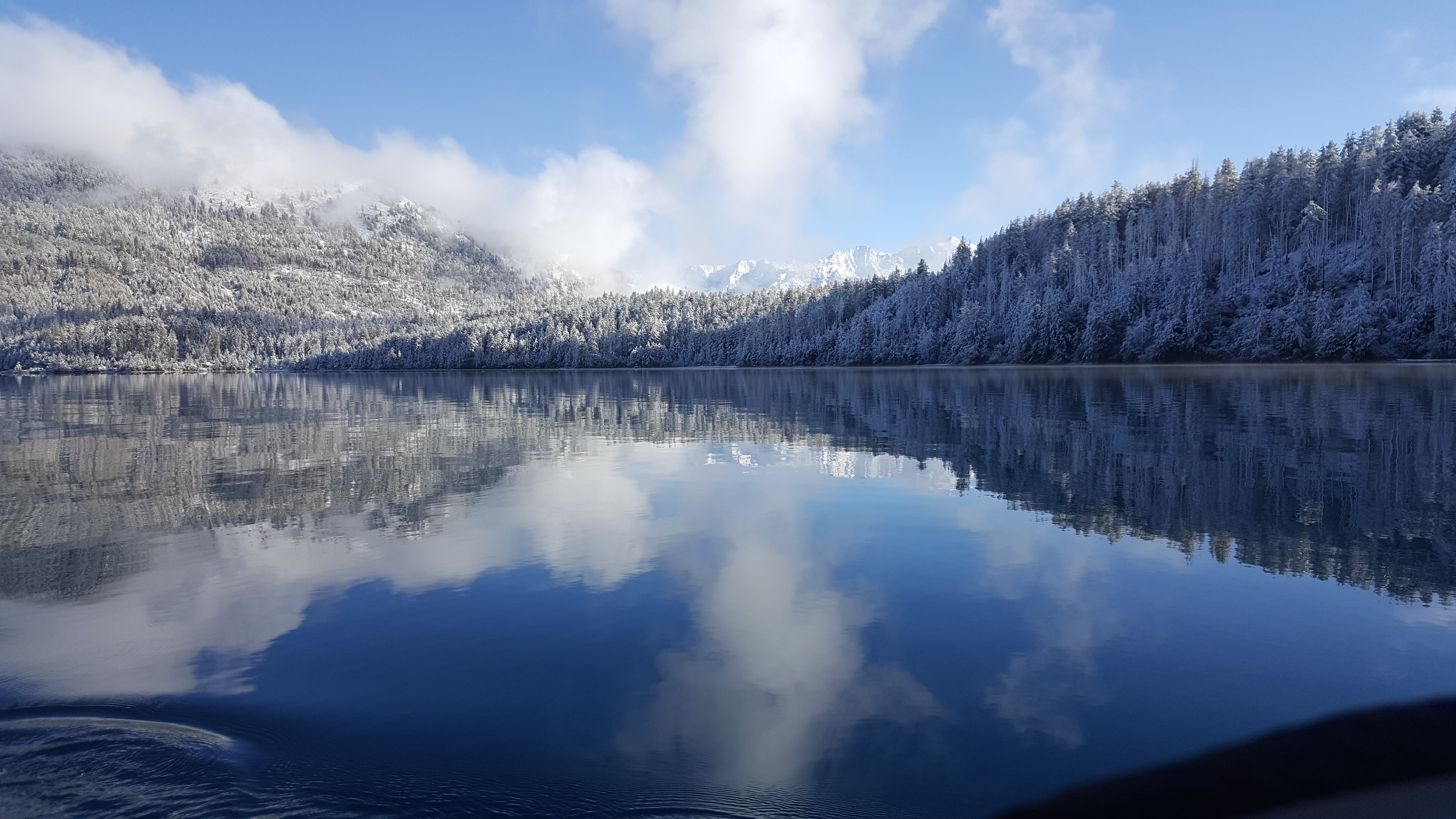
Rara Lake in winter

From December to March, the temperatures are below the freezing point, and heavy snowfall occurs, blocking the way to the lake. April to June is warm in this region.

Climate data for Rara Lake, elevation 3,048 m (10,000 ft)
| Month | Jan | Feb | Mar | Apr | May | Jun | Jul | Aug | Sep | Oct | Nov | Dec | Year |
|---|---|---|---|---|---|---|---|---|---|---|---|---|---|
| Mean daily maximum °C (°F) | 7.5 (45.5) | 9.3 (48.7) | 13.6 (56.5) | 18.8 (65.8) | 21.0 (69.8) | 21.6 (70.9) | 18.7 (65.7) | 18.6 (65.5) | 18.1 (64.6) | 15.8 (60.4) | 10.1 (50.2) | 8.0 (46.4) | 15.1 (59.2) |
| Daily mean °C (°F) | 2.5 (36.5) | 3.9 (39.0) | 8.1 (46.6) | 11.3 (52.3) | 13.5 (56.3) | 15.5 (59.9) | 14.5 (58.1) | 14.3 (57.7) | 13.3 (55.9) | 9.8 (49.6) | 5.1 (41.2) | 3.2 (37.8) | 9.6 (49.2) |
| Mean daily minimum °C (°F) | −2.3 (27.9) | −1.5 (29.3) | 2.9 (37.2) | 3.7 (38.7) | 6.0 (42.8) | 9.5 (49.1) | 10.3 (50.5) | 10.1 (50.2) | 8.5 (47.3) | 4.0 (39.2) | 0.2 (32.4) | −1.5 (29.3) | 4.2 (39.5) |
| Average precipitation mm (inches) | 31.4 (1.24) | 42.7 (1.68) | 49.7 (1.96) | 43.3 (1.70) | 69.5 (2.74) | 81.8 (3.22) | 192.4 (7.57) | 207.6 (8.17) | 106.1 (4.18) | 30.1 (1.19) | 8.5 (0.33) | 22.0 (0.87) | 885.1 (34.85) |
Source: FAO JICA

== Socio-cultural and religious values ==
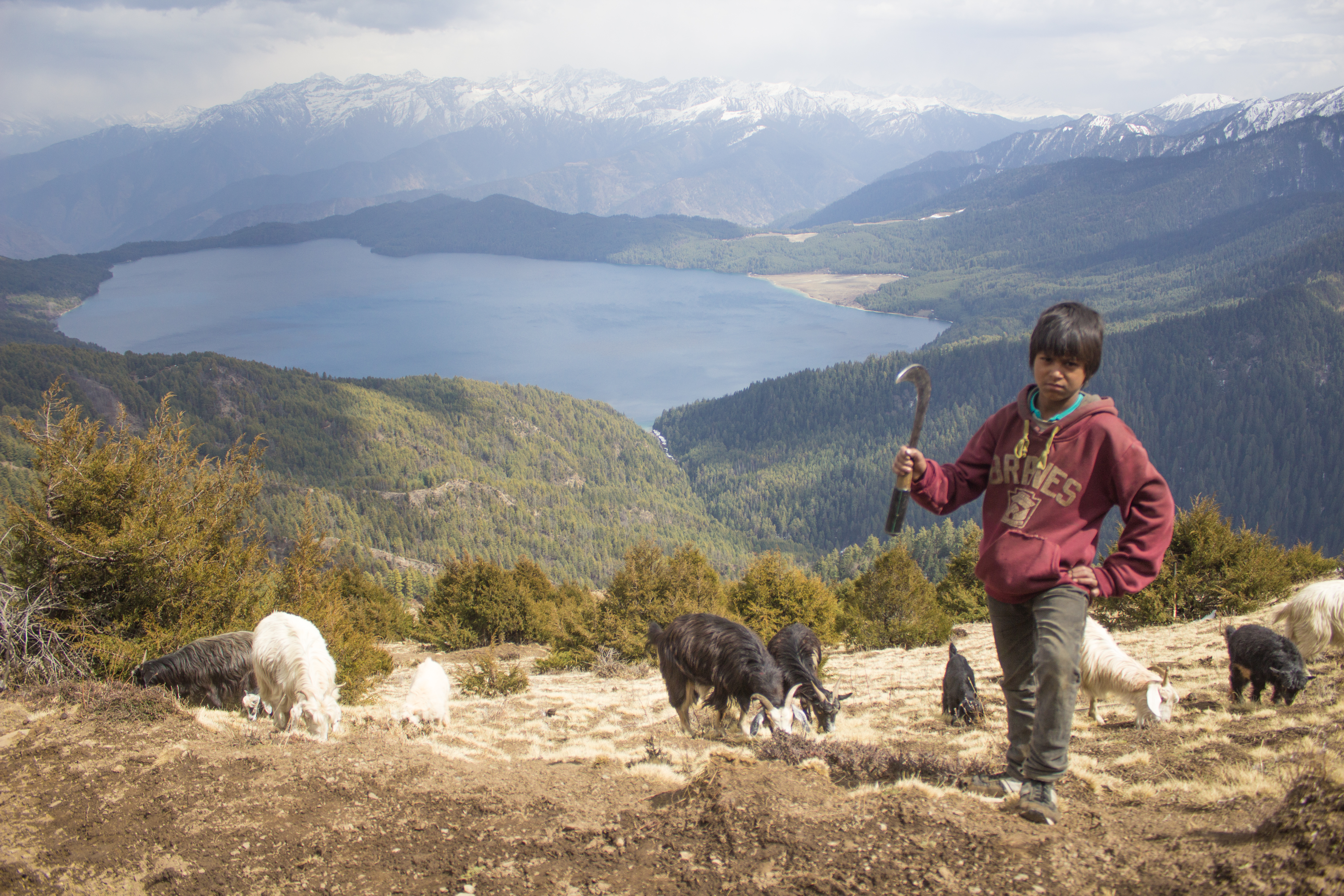
Rara lake view from top of Murma mountain

The main occupation of the people living around the area is agriculture. People also rear goats and extract medicinal herbs and sell them for their living.

== Environmental issues ==
Due to over-grazing and defecation, the national park conservation officers are facing a challenge to preserve the lake. Local people are found cutting timber wood and fuel wood, which is a problem for conservation of Rara. Also during festivals visitors and local people produce a lot of wastage causing water pollution.

== Transport ==
Rara Lake does not have connection to the national road network and can only be reached from the nearest town Jumla by trekking. From Nepalgunj there is two ways to reach the lake, one is by following the salt route to Humla and another following a number of trails through Dolpo region. The nearest airports are Talcha Airport in Mugu and Jumla Airport in Jumla. A public bus also runs from Surkhet to Mugu District headquarter Gamgadhi.
