= Kathmandu International Mountain Film Festival =

The Kathmandu International Mountain Film Festival (KIMFF) has been held in Kathmandu since 2000. Starting out as a biennial festival, KIMFF turned annual and competitive in 2007. KIMFF typically takes places around 11 December to coincide with the International Mountain Day.

== Modes ==
KIMFF uses cinemas, other visual art forms, workshops and discussion forums to inform and educate as wide and as large a variety of audience on particular issues within the duration of the festival. After the completion of festival in Kathmandu, a special package of films is taken to various locations within Nepal as a part of Travelling KIMFF. Extreme sports, adventure, religion, or distinct cultural practices, human beings relate with mountains in a myriad of ways. In a world whose character and landscapes are rapidly changing, our relationship with mountains is only getting broader, subtler, and more intricate. The growing diversity and complexity of this relationship is what Kathmandu International Mountain Film Festival (KIMFF) seeks to explore.

KIMFF, the only festival of its kind east of Suez, brings to Kathmandu Valley some of the most recent and exciting films about mountains, mountain environment, mountain cultures and communities from various corners of the world. KIMFF screens films produced during the last three years and features discussion forums, on-demand screenings, as well as exhibitions of books and photography celebrating mountains. The festival is organized with the conviction that human experiences in the world’s highlands, especially those in the developing countries, is worth documenting and sharing. KIMFF hopes not only to encourage a deeper understanding of the social and cultural realities of those regions but also to create a sense that the significance of those regions is often far-flung. Organized by Himal Association, KIMFF started as a non-competitive, biennial festival in 2000. A wide selection of films – alpine documentation, archival footage, adventure cinema, experimental shorts, commentaries, anthropological narratives, feature films, etc. – have been screened in the previous four festivals. These movies have dealt with issues regarding cultural practices, lifestyles, conflict, wildlife, mountain-climbing, environment, globalization, and gender, among many others.

Over the years, the festival has attracted not only filmmakers, film enthusiasts, and critics, but also scholars, journalists, activists, and mountaineers. It is the interest of this creative and intellectual community that has sustained KIMFF and placed Kathmandu Valley on the map of international film festivals. The impetus for the festival has always been the trust of this community in the capability of the audio-visual medium in creating social and economic transformations.

== International ==
KIMFF is also one of the member of International Alliance for Mountain Film (IAMF) among others like Banff Mountain Film Festival, Trento Film Festival, Autrans and others.

== See also ==
- Mountain film
